The Rattanakosin Kingdom (abbreviated as), the Kingdom of Siam, or the Early Bangkok Empire (1767–1851), were names used to reference the fourth and current Thai kingdom in the history of Thailand (then known as Siam). It was founded in 1782 with the establishment of Rattanakosin (Bangkok), which replaced the city of Thonburi as the capital of Siam. This article covers the period until the Siamese revolution of 1932.

The maximum zone of influence of Rattanakosin included the vassal states of Cambodia, Laos, Shan States, and the northern Malay states. The kingdom was founded by Rama I of the Chakri Dynasty. The first half of this period was characterized by the consolidation of Siamese power in the center of Mainland Southeast Asia and was punctuated by contests and wars for regional supremacy with rival powers Burma and Vietnam. The second period was one of engagements with the colonial powers of Britain and France in which Siam remained the only Southeast Asian state to maintain its independence.

Internally the kingdom developed into a centralized, absolutist, nation state with borders defined by interactions with Western powers. The period was marked by the increased centralization of the monarch's powers, the abolition of labor control, the transition to an agrarian economy, the expansion of control over distant tributary states, the creation of a monolithic national identity, and the emergence of an urban middle class. However, the failure to implement democratic reforms culminated in the Siamese revolution of 1932 and the establishment of a constitutional monarchy.

History

Early Rattanakosin period (1782–1855)

Foundation of Bangkok 

Chakri ruled under the name Ramathibodi, but was generally known as King Rama I, he moved the royal seat from Thonburi on the west bank of Chao Phraya River to the east bank, to the village of Bang Makok, meaning "place of olive plums". This was done due to its better strategic position in defenses against Burmese invasions from the West, the area was protected from attack by the river to the west and by a series of canals to the north, east and south. The east bank was surrounded by low marshlands inhabited by the Chinese, whom King Rama I ordered to move to Sampheng. The official foundation date of Bangkok is April 21, 1782 when the city pillar was consecrated in a ceremony. King Rama I underwent an abbreviated form of coronation in 1782. He founded the Chakri dynasty and made his younger brother Chao Phraya Surasi the Wangna or Prince Sura Singhanat of the Front Palace. In 1783, the Bangkok city walls were constructed with part of the bricks taken from the Ayutthaya ruins. Lao and Cambodian laborers were assigned to dig the city moat. The Grand Palace and the Wat Phra Kaew were completed in 1784 and the Emerald Buddha was transferred from Wat Arun to be placed in Wat Phra Kaew. In 1785, King Rama I performed a full coronation ceremony and named the new city "Rattanakosin", which meant the "Jewel of Indra" referring to the Emerald Buddha.

Burmese wars 

The Burmese continued to pose a major threat to the Siamese state of existence. In 1785, King Bodawpaya of the Burmese Konbaung dynasty sent massive armies to invade Siam in five directions during the Nine Armies' War. Decades of continuous warfare had left Siam depopulated and the Siamese court managed to muster only a total of 70,000 men against the 144,000 men of Burmese invaders. The Burmese, however, were over-stretched and unable to converge. Prince Sura Singhanat led his army to defeat the main army of King Bodawpaya in the Battle of Latya in Kanchanaburi in 1786. In the north, the Burmese laid siege on Lanna Lampang. Kawila, the ruler of Lampang, managed to hold the siege for four months until relief forces from Bangkok came to rescue Lampang. In the south, Lady Chan and Lady Mook were able to fend off Burmese attacks on Thalang (Phuket) in 1786. After the unfruitful campaign, King Bodawpaya sent his son Uparaja Thado Minsaw to invade Kanchanaburi concentrating only in one direction. King Rama I and his brother Prince Sura Singhanat defeated the Burmese in the Tha Dindaeng Campaign in 1786–1787.

After these victories over Burmese invaders, Siam staged offensives on the Tenasserim Coast, which was the former territory of Ayutthaya. King Rama I marched Siamese armies to lay siege on Tavoy in 1788 but did not succeed. In 1792, the Burmese governors of Tavoy and Mergui defected to Siam. Siam came to temporarily occupy the Tenasserim Coast. However, as the court was preparing for the invasions of Lower Burma, King Bodawpaya sent his son Thado Minsaw to reclaim Tenasserim. The Siamese were soundly defeated by the Burmese in the Battle of Tavoy in 1793 and ceded the Tenasserim Coast to Burma for perpetuity, becoming modern Tanintharyi Division.

Lord Kawila was finally able to re-establish Chiang Mai as the centre of Lanna in 1797. King Bodawpaya was eager to regain Burmese control over Lanna. The Burmese invaded Chiang Mai in 1797 and 1802, in both occasions Kawila defended the city and Prince Sura Singhanat marched north to relieve Chiang Mai. The Siamese and Lanna forces then proceeded to capture Chiang Saen, the stronghold of Burmese authority in Lanna, in 1804, eliminating Burmese influence in that region. Siamese victories over the Burmese in Lanna allowed Siam to expand domination north towards the northernmost Tai princedoms: Keng Tung and Chianghung. Kawila of Chiang Mai sent forces to raid Keng Tung in 1802 and subjugated Mong Yawng, Mueang Luang Phukha, and Chiang Hung in 1805. In 1805, the Prince of Nan invaded the Tai Lue confederacy of Sipsongpanna and Chiang Hung surrendered.

Prince Sura Singhanat died in 1803. King Rama I appointed his own son Prince Itsarasunthon as the succeeding Prince of the Front Palace in 1806. King Rama I died in 1809 and Prince Itsarasunthon ascended the throne to become King Rama II. King Bodawpaya then took the opportunity to initiate the Burmese invasion of Thalang on the Andaman Coast. Meanwhile, the court in Bangkok sent armies to relieve Thalang but faced logistic difficulties and Thalang fell to the Burmese in 1810. However, the Siamese were still able to repel the Burmese from Thalang. The Burmese invasion of Phuket in 1809–1810 was the last Burmese incursion into Siamese territories in Thai history. Siam remained vigilant of prospective Burmese invasions through the 1810s. Only when Burma ceded Tenasserim to the British in the Treaty of Yandabo in 1826 in the aftermath of the First Anglo-Burmese War that Burmese threats effectively ended.

Eastern fronts: Laos, Cambodia, and Vietnam 

When Siamese forces took Vientiane in 1779 during the Thonburi period, all three Lao kingdoms of Luang Phrabang, Vientiane and Champasak came under Siamese domination. Lao Princes Nanthasen, Inthavong and Anouvong were taken as hostages to Bangkok. In 1782, King Rama I installed Nanthasen as King of Vientiane. However, Nanthasen was dethroned in 1795 due to his alleged diplomatic overtures with the Tây Sơn dynasty in favor of Inthavong. When King Inthavong died in 1804, Anouvong succeeded as King of Vientiane.

Yumreach Baen, a pro-Siamese Cambodian noble, staged a coup in Cambodia to overthrow and kill the pro-Vietnamese Cambodian Prime Minister Tolaha Mu in 1783. Chaos and upheavals that ensued caused Yumreach Baen to take young King Ang Eng to Bangkok. King Rama I appointed Yumreach Baen as Chaophraya Aphaiphubet. Also in 1783, Nguyễn Phúc Ánh arrived in Bangkok to take refuge from the Tây Sơn rebels. In 1784, Siamese forces invaded Saigon to reinstate Nguyễn Phúc Ánh but were defeated in the Battle of Rạch Gầm-Xoài Mút by the Tây Sơn. In 1789, Aphaiphubet took control of Cambodia and became the Regent. Later that same year Nguyễn Phúc Ánh took Saigon and established himself in Southern Vietnam. In 1794, King Rama I allowed Ang Eng to return to Cambodia to rule as king and carved the northwestern part of Cambodia including Battambang and Siemreap for Aphaiphubet to govern as governor under direct Siamese rule.

King Ang Eng of Cambodia died in 1796 and was succeeded by his son Ang Chan II who became pro-Vietnamese. While the pro-Siamese Prince Ang Sngoun, younger brother of Ang Chan II, decided to rebel against his brother in 1811. The Siamese forces marched from Battambang to Oudong. The panicked King Ang Chan II fled to take refuge at Saigon under the protection of Vietnam. Siamese forces sacked Oudong and returned. Lê Văn Duyệt brought Ang Chan II back to Phnom Penh to rule under Vietnamese influence.

King Anouvong of Vientiane rebelled against Siam in 1827. He led the Lao armies to capture Nakhon Ratchasima and Saraburi, while his son King Raxabut Nyô of Champasak invaded Southern Isan. Phraya Palat and his wife Lady Mo led the Siamese captives to rise against their Lao overseers in the Battle of Samrit Fields. King Rama III sent Prince Sakdipolsep of the Front Palace to defeat Anouvong at Nong Bua Lamphu and Phraya Ratchasuphawadi (later Chaophraya Bodindecha) to capture Raxabut Nyô. Anouvong and his family fled to Nghệ An Province of Vietnam under protection of Emperor Ming Mạng. Ming Mạng sent Anouvong back to Vientiane to negotiate with Siam. However, Anouvong retook control of Vientiane only to be pushed back by Phraya Ratchasuphawadi in 1828. Anouvong was eventually captured and sent to Bangkok where he was imprisoned and died in 1829.

Anouvong's rebellion worsened Siamese-Vietnamese relations. Lê Văn Duyệt died in 1832 and his posthumous punishments by Ming Mạng spurred the Lê Văn Khôi rebellion at Saigon in 1833. King Rama III took the opportunity to eliminate Vietnamese influence in the region. He assigned Chaophraya Bodindecha to lead armies on invading Cambodia and Saigon, while Chaophraya Phrakhlang led the fleet. However, the Siamese forces were defeated in the naval Battle of Vàm Nao and retreated. The Siamese defeat confirmed Vietnamese domination over Cambodia. Ming Mạng annexed Cambodia into Trấn Tây Province with Trương Minh Giảng as the governor. After the death of Ang Chan II, Minh Mạng also installed Ang Mey as puppet queen regnant of Cambodia. In 1840, the Cambodians arose in general rebellion against Vietnamese domination. Bodindecha marched Siamese armies to attack Pursat and Kampong Svay in 1841. The new Vietnamese Emperor Thiệu Trị ordered the Vietnamese to retreat and the Siamese took over Cambodia. The war resumed in 1845 when Emperor Thiệu Trị sent Nguyễn Tri Phương to successfully take Phnom Penh and lay siege on Siamese-held Oudong. After months of siege, Siam and Vietnam negotiated for peace with Prince Ang Duong, who would recognize both Siamese and Vietnamese suzerainty, installed as the new King of Cambodia in 1848.

Malay Peninsula and contacts with the West 
After the Fall of Ayutthaya in 1767, the Northern Malay states that used to pay bunga mas tributes to Siam were freed temporarily from Siamese domination. In 1786, after expelling Burmese invaders from Southern Siam, Prince Sura Singhanat declared that the Northern Malay sultanates should resume tributary obligations as it had during the Ayutthaya period. Kedah and Terengganu resolved to send tributes but Pattani refused. The Siamese prince then sent armies to sack Pattani in 1786, bringing Pattani into Siamese rule. The Malay states of Pattani, Kedah and Terengganu (including Kelantan, which was then part of Terengganu) came under Siamese suzerainty as tributary states. Pattani rebelled in 1789–1791 and 1808. Siam ended up dividing Pattani into seven distinct townships to rule. Kelantan was separated from Terengganu in 1814. In 1821, Sultan Ahmad Tajuddin Halim Shah II (known in Thai sources as Tuanku Pangeran) of Kedah was found forging an alliance with Burma – Siam's longtime rival. Siamese forces under Phraya Nakhon Noi the "Raja of Ligor" invaded and captured Kedah. Sultan Ahmad Tajuddin took refuge in British-held Penang. A son of Nakhon Noi was installed as the governor of Kedah. The Kedah sultanate ceased to exist for a time being.

Since the 15th century, the Siamese royal court had retained a monopoly on foreign trades through the Phra Khlang Sinkha or Royal Warehouse. Foreign merchants had to present their ships and goods at Phra Khlang Sinkha for tariffs to be levied and goods to be purchased by the Royal Warehouse. Foreigners could not directly and privately trade important profitable government-restricted goods with the native Siamese. In 1821, the Governor-General of British India, in the mission to establish trade contacts with Siam, sent John Crawfurd to Bangkok. Crawfurd arrived in Bangkok in 1822, delivering both the British concern of Sultan Ahmad Tajuddin and also for demands of trade concessions; however the negotiations soured. Siam sent troops to aid the British in Tenasserim in the First Anglo-Burmese War. However, a dispute prompted King Rama III to withdraw the Siamese armies from Burma. In 1825, the British sent another mission led by Henry Burney to Bangkok. The Anglo-Siamese Burney Treaty was signed in 1826, in which centuries-old royal Siamese monopoly over Western trades ended, this allowed the British to trade freely in Siam. The treaty also recognized Siamese claims over Kedah. However, some trade restrictions including the Phasi Pak Ruea or measurement duties were still intact. Siam also concluded the similar "Roberts Treaty" with the United States in 1833.

Tunku Kudin, a nephew of the former Kedah sultan, reclaimed Kedah by force in 1831 and rose up against Siam. Pattani, Kelantan and Terengganu joined on the Kedahan side against Siam. King Rama III sent forces under Nakhon Noi and a navy fleet under Chaophraya Phrakhlang to put down the Malay insurgency. The Raja of Ligor recaptured Kedah in 1832. In 1838, Tunku Muhammad Sa'ad, another nephew of the Kedah sultan, in concert with Wan Muhammad Ali (called Wan Mali in Thai sources) an Andaman Sea adventurer, again retook Alor Setar from the Siamese. Kedahan forces invaded Southern Siam, attacking Trang, Pattani and Songkhla. King Rama III sent a fleet, led by Phraya Siphiphat (younger brother of Phrakhlang), to quell the rebellion. Siamese forces recaptured Alor Setar in 1839. Chaophraya Nakhon Noi the Raja of Ligor died in 1838, leaving Malay affairs to Phraya Siphiphat. The latter then divided Kedah into four states: Setul, Kubang Pasu, Perlis and Kedah proper. The former Kedah sultan reconciled with the Siamese and he was finally restored as Sultan of Kedah in 1842. The journey of Phraya Siphiphat to the south in 1839 coincided with the Kelantanese Civil War. Sultan Muhammad II of Kelantan had conflicts with his rival contender Tuan Besar and requested for military aid from Phraya Siphiphat. Siphiphat, however, posted himself as the negotiator and forced a peace agreement upon the warring Kelantanese factions. Tuan Besar rebelled again in 1840. Siam resolved to move Tuan Besar to somewhere else to placate the conflicts. Eventually, Tuan Besar was made the ruler of Pattani in 1842, becoming Sultan Phaya Long Muhammad of Pattani. His descendants would continue to rule Pattani until 1902.

After the First Opium War, the British Empire emerged as the most powerful maritime power in the region and was eager for more favorable trade agreements. By the 1840s, Siam had re-imposed trade tariffs through the Chinese tax collector system. Both the British and the Americans sent their delegates (Brooke and Balestier) to Bangkok in 1850 to propose treaty amendments but were strongly rejected. Only with the Bowring Treaty of 1855 that these goals were achieved, liberalizing the Siamese economy and ushering a new period of Thai history. King Rama III reportedly said on his deathbed in 1851: "...there will be no more wars with Vietnam and Burma. We will have them only with the West". King Mongkut, who had been a Buddhist monk for 27 years, ascended the throne in 1851 with support from the Bunnag family. King Mongkut made his younger brother Pinklao the Vice-King or Second King of the Front Palace. Mongkut also granted the exceptionally high rank of Somdet Chaophraya to the Bunnag brothers – Chaophraya Phrakhlang (Dit Bunnag) and Phraya Siphiphat (That Bunnag), who became Somdet Chaophraya Prayurawong and Somdet Chaophraya Phichaiyat, respectively, cementing the roles and powers of the Bunnag family in Siamese foreign affairs during the mid-19th century. Chuang Bunnag, Prayurawong's son, became Chaophraya Si Suriyawong.

Early Modern Siam (1855–1905)

Bowring Treaty and consequences 

King Mongkut and Chaophraya Si Suriyawong realized that, due to the geopolitical situation, Siam could stand no more against British demands for concessions. Sir John Bowring the Governor of Hong Kong, who was the representative of the British government in London (rather than East India Company), arrived at Bangkok in 1855. The Bowring Treaty was signed in April 1855, in which tariffs were reduced and standardized to three percent and the Phasi Pak Ruea (measurement duties) was abolished. The treaty granted extraterritoriality to the British in Siam, who would be subject to a British consular authority and British law instead of traditional Siamese inquisition, as Westerners sought to dissociate themselves from Siamese Nakhonban methods of judiciary tortures. The treaty also stipulated the establishment of a British consulate in Bangkok. The Bowring Treaty was followed by similar 'unequal treaties' with other Western nations including the United States (Townsend Harris, May 1856), France (Charles de Montigny, August 1856), Denmark (1858), Portugal (1858), the Netherlands (1860) and Prussia (Eulenberg, 1861), all of which Prince Wongsathirat Sanit, Mongkut's younger half-brother and Chaophraya Si Suriyawong (called 'Kalahom' in Western sources) were the main negotiators. King Mongkut also declared freedom of religion to his subjects in 1858.The Bowring Treaty had a great socioeconomic impact on Siam, the Siamese economy was neoliberalized; it began to transform from a self-subsistence to export-oriented economy and was incorporated into the world economy. The liberation of rice export, which had been previously restricted, led to rapid growth of rice plantations and production in Central Siam as rice arose to become Siam's top export commodity. The increased scale of production led to demands for manpower in the industry that rendered the traditional corvée system less useful and thus social changes were needed. The Bowring Treaty of 1855 marks the beginning of 'modern' Siam in most histories. However, these commercial concessions took a drastic effect on government revenues, which was sacrificed in the name of national security and trade liberalization. The government relied on the corrupt and ineffective Chinese tax collector system to generate and levy numerous new tax farms that would compensate revenue loss. The disarray of the Siamese tax system would lead to fiscal reforms in 1873.

Siam managed the balance between European governments and their own colonial administrations. King Mongkut sent Siamese missions to London in 1857 and to Paris in 1861. These missions were the first Siamese missions to Europe after the last one in 1688 during the Ayutthaya period. The Bunnag family dominated the kingdom's foreign affairs. France acquired Cochinchina in 1862. The French were proven to be a hostile new neighbor. King Ang Duong of Cambodia died in 1860, followed by a civil war between his sons Norodom and Si Votha which led to Norodom to seek French assistance. French admiral Pierre-Paul de La Grandière had Norodom sign a treaty that placed Cambodia under French protection in 1863 without Siam's acknowledgement and the French crowned Norodom as King of Cambodia in 1864. Si Suriyawong the Kalahom responded by having Norodom sign another opposing treaty that recognized Siamese suzerainty over Cambodia and had it published in The Straits Times in 1864, much to the embarrassment of Gabriel Aubaret of the French consul. The French sought to annul the opposing treaty as Aubaret brought a gunboat to Bangkok. A Franco-Siamese compromise draft over Cambodian issues was signed in 1865 but ratification was delayed in Paris due to the prospect that France would accept Siamese claims over 'Siamese Laos'. Siam sent another mission to Paris to settle disputes. The treaty was finally ratified in Paris in July 1867, in which Siam officially ceded Cambodia but retained northwestern Cambodia including Battambang and Siem Reap, which would also later be ceded in 1907.

Western imperialism introduced Siam to a new concept of border demarcation and territorial proclamations. In pre-modern Southeast Asia, borders between polities were ill-defined. The traditional Siamese government system previously only had an authority in cities, towns and agricultural areas; while mountains and forests were largely left alone as they were difficult to be reached by authorities. In the era of colonialism, border claims and mapmaking were keys to Siam's standing against colonial encroachments. British and Siamese delegates met at the Tenasserim Hills in 1866 to explore and define Anglo-Siamese borders between Siam and British Burma from the Salween River to the Andaman Sea, thus becoming the modern Myanmar-Thailand border when the treaty was signed in 1868.

Regency of Si Suriyawong 

When King Mongkut ascended the throne in 1851, he appointed his younger brother Pinklao as Vice-King or Second King of the Front Palace, giving Pinklao immense powers. Vice-King Pinklao predeceased King Mongkut in 1866. After the demise of his peers, Chaophraya Si Suriyawong emerged as the most powerful nobleman. King Mongkut took a trip to observe a solar eclipse at Prachuap Khiri Khan but contracted malaria and died in October 1868. His 15 year old son Chulalongkorn was confirmed to succeed the throne under the regency of Si Suriyawong. The latter unprecedentedly made Wichaichan, son of Pinklao, Vice-King of the Front Palace and heir presumptive without Chulalongkorn's consent. His regency was a time when the power of the Bunnags reached an apex. The young king Chulalongkorn, who had been educated by Western teachers including Anna Leonowens and who was then powerless under the sway of the Bunnag regent, spent his early reign learning and observing. Chulalongkorn visited Singapore and Dutch Java in 1871 and British India in 1872 where he learned about Western colonial administrations, becoming the first Siamese monarch to travel aboard. Chulalongkorn formed the Young Siam Society, composing of liberal Westernizing young princes and noblemen who aimed at state financial reforms and the abolition of government-regulated manpower control for the development of the economy, people and the kingdom, and also to consolidate royal power through centralization.

When King Chulalongkorn reached the age of 20 in 1873, the regency ended as Si Suriyawong was rewarded with the highest rank of Somdet Chaophraya, becoming Somdet Chaophraya Si Suriyawong. Under the ineffective Chinese tax collector system, King Chulalongkorn found the government treasury to be in debt. He initiated his reforms with the establishment of Ho Ratsadakorn Phiphat or the Financial Auditory Office in June 1873 to centralize and reorganize the taxation system to attain a more stringent revenue collection. Chulalongkorn underwent his second coronation in October 1873 to signify the assumption of the authorities but Si Suriyawong continued to hold de facto power. The king also appointed the Council of State in May 1874, composing of mid-ranking nobles from the Young Siam faction, and the 'Privy Council' in August 1874, comprising exclusively of royal princes. Chulalongkorn's fiscal reforms conflicted with the existing benefits of the old nobility and put the king in political conflict with Si Suriyawong, who represented the conservative faction. Chulalongkorn exerted his legislative powers through the Council of State that passed many laws concerning tax reforms.  Also in 1874, King Chulalongkorn made his first gradual step towards the abolition of slavery by decreeing that the redemption price of a child slave would continue to decline over age until the age of 21 when they would be freed.

Both Chulalongkorn and Si Suriyawong agreed to abolish corvée labor. However, these reforms upset Prince Wichaichan of the Front Palace who had inherited from his father Pinklao, a huge manpower in service with more than one-thirds of the kingdom's revenue accorded to him, he also had the support of Thomas George Knox the British consul. On one night in December 1874, a fire broke out in the king's royal palace, in which the Front Palace police forces were to enter to help put down fires but they were denied entry by the king's guards for fear that the Front Palace had set up the fire scene to enter the king's quarters. King Chulalongkorn then had his guards surround the Front Palace. This incident was known as the Front Palace Crisis or the Wangna Crisis. Chulalongkorn, in his "swimming to the crocodile" move, asked Si Suriyawong for intervention to placate the situation. Si Suriyawong, however, suggested hard terms on Wichaichan who then fled to take refuge inside the British consulate five days later in January 1875. Siam was on the brink of civil war and foreign intervention with Wichaichan resisting any compromises for he believed the British would give him full support. After many unsuccessful negotiations, Si Suriyawong suggested that the British invited a respectable figure to deal with this situation. Andrew Clarke the governor of the Straits Settlements, who had earlier maintained friendly relations with Chulalongkorn, arrived in Bangkok from Singapore in February 1875 to act as mediator. Clarke was sympathetic to the king's cause and his intervention was fruitful. Wichaichan was forced to accept humiliating terms of giving up his Vice-King position but retaining the Front Palace Office, a reduction of his manpower to 200 men and his virtual grounding inside the Front Palace.

The aftermath of this crisis was a political triumph for Chulalongkorn and the waning of the Bunnag powers as Si Suriyawong retired to his estate in Ratchaburi. In April 1875, Chulalongkorn created the modern Ministry of Finance that took over control of all revenues. However, a conservative faction won the day as King Chulalongkorn chose to stall further reforms for a decade to prevent political conflicts. The king realized that his old regent still held substantial powers and that he needed more political consolidation for reforms. Only after the death of Si Suriyawong in 1883 that King Chulalongkorn was able to assume his full powers and implement his reforms. When Prince Wichaichan died in 1885, Chulalongkorn abolished the centuries-old Office of Front Palace altogether in 1886 and appointed his own son Vajirunhis as a Western-style Crown Prince and heir apparent instead.

Threats from Western powers 

After the defeat of the Taiping Rebellion in China in 1864, the remaining Chinese dissident forces entered Northern Vietnam in 1868, pillaging and occupying Tai princedoms of Sipsong Chuthai and Houaphanh that would normally send tributes to the Lao Kings of Luang Phrabang. Siamese people called the Chinese who came from the northern highlands as Haw – hence the name Haw Wars. Haw insurgents coalesced into Banner Armies, most notably the Black Flag Army and the Yellow Flag. In 1875, the Yellow Flag Army attacked Muang Phuan, occupied the Plain or Jars and attacked Nongkhai. King Chulalongkorn sent Siamese armies who managed to temporarily drive the Haws into the mountains. The Yellow Flag Army was defeated in 1875 by Chinese authorities and disintegrated into petty groups of bandits but had a resurgence and made their permanent settlement at the Plain of Jars.In pre-modern Southeast Asia, traditional polities were not defined by territorial borders but rather a network and a hierarchy of alliances and tributary obligations defined by the mandala system. A multicultural Siamese empire had hosted a number of tributary states including Lanna Chiangmai, the Lao Kingdoms of Luang Phrabang and Champasak, minor Lao-Lanna chiefdoms and Muslim Malay sultanates of the south. In facing colonial encroachment, however, territories and sovereignty had to be clearly defined. The British acquired Upper Burma and the French acquired Tonkin in 1886. This development escalated imperialist designs on Siam and led to increased Western presence in the northern Siamese hinterlands. The Anglo-Siamese Treaty of Chiangmai in 1883 agreed to place British subjects in Northern Siam under the jurisdiction of a binational court under a possible intervention from the newly-appointed British vice-consul in Chiangmai. A similar agreement in Luang Phrabang was concluded with the French in 1886. Siam responded to imperialist threats with centralization and internal restructuring that integrated tributary states into Siam proper, ending their autonomies. Lanna lords had benefitted from their traditional ownership of the vast northern teak forests and their sometimes-conflicting forestry patents granted to British loggers might provoke British intervention. Lanna was the first target of reforms as it stood at the frontline of a possible British incursion. The Chiangmai Treaty of 1883 urged Bangkok to tighten its control over Lanna to discuss treaty terms with the British. King Chulalongkorn sent a royal commissioner to Chiangmai in 1883 to initiate reforms. Central-Siamese-style governance and stringent taxation were imposed. Reforms were promising at first but gradually dwindled away due to the persistence of Lanna rulers, whose traditional privileges and powers were compromised by the reforms. Siam also laid claims to Shan states east of the Salween river including Kengtung but later conceded to the British occupation of the eastern Shan States. 

King Chulalongkorn sent another Siamese expedition to subjugate the Haws at the Plain of Jars in 1884–1885 but the campaign was disastrous. The Siamese court then took a more serious approach on the Chinese insurgents. Freshly-modernized Siamese regiments were sent to suppress the Haws and to take control of the frontier in 1885. Chaomuen Waiworanat (later Chaophraya Surasak Montri) took a commanding position at Muang Xon to pacify Houaphanh and then proceed to Muang Thaeng in Sipsong Chuthai. However, Siamese forces faced resistance from Đèo Văn Trị, son of Đèo Văn Sinh the White Tai ruler of Muang Lay, who was closely allied with the Black Flags. These events coincided with the arrival of Auguste Pavie, a Parti Colonial advocate, in February 1887 to assume the position of the French consul in Luang Phrabang. Unable to go further, Waiworanat ended his campaign in April 1887, taking Haw and Tai captives, among them the brothers of Đèo Văn Trị to Bangkok. The enraged Đèo Văn Trị led the Black Flag Army to seize and plunder Luang Phrabang in June 1887. Auguste Pavie rescued King Ounkham of Luang Phrabang and took him on a canoe to Bangkok. The French took this opportunity to enter and occupy Sipsong Chuthai, which Siam had attempted to claim. After arguments between Surasak Montri and Pavie, it was agreed in 1888 that French Indochina received Sipsong Chuthai while Siam retained Houaphanh.

Franco-Siamese relations deteriorated after the French seizure of Sipsong Chuthai in 1887. Auguste Pavie, who had earlier been transferred to become French consul in Bangkok, brought the gunboat Lutin to Bangkok in March 1893 and pressed the Siamese government to relinquish all Lao lands on the left (east) bank of the Mekong River. When Siam did not comply, the French advanced their forces into Laos, resulting in the killing of French officer Grosgurin at the hands of Phra Yot Mueang Khwang the Siamese governor of Khammouan in June 1893. The French parliament in Paris, dominated by colonialist sentiments, ordered strong military retaliation on Siam. Two more French gunboats, Inconstant and Comète, entered the Chao Phraya River, forcing its way up to Bangkok to threaten the Siamese royal palace as gunfire was exchanged between French gunboats and the Siamese Chulachomklao Fort during the Paknam Incident. Prince Devawongse the Minister of Foreign Affairs went to 'congratulate' the French invaders but Pavie presented an ultimatum, urging Siam to cede lands east of the Mekong, to pay an indemnity of three million francs and to punish Phra Yot Mueang Khwang. As Siam hesitated, the French imposed a naval blockade on Bangkok. The Siamese court hoped to find British support against French aggression but the British were unresponsive so Siam resolved to comply unconditionally to French demands in July 1893. French gunboats left Bangkok in August 1893 but proceeded to occupy Chanthaburi on Siam's eastern coast to assure their compliance. The treaty was signed in October 1893. Laos, which had been under Siamese rule for about a century since 1779, joined French Indochina in 1893. The Franco–Siamese War of 1893 or Crisis of Year 112 was the time when Siam came closest to being conquered by a Western imperialist power.

Reforms of King Chulalongkorn 

After the demise of Somdet Chaophraya Si Suriyawong in 1883, King Chulalongkorn was in control of the government by the mid-1880s and was able to implement reforms. After decades of powerful domination by the nobility, Chulalongkorn brought many royal princes – his brothers and sons – to government roles. The princes received modernized education and formed an educated elite. The king began to send his sons for European education in 1885. Many princes were specialized in their responsible fields. Most notable ones were Prince Devawongse who specialized in foreign affairs and Prince Damrong in internal affairs. Following the European model, by the suggestion of Prince Devawongse, King Chulalongkorn began to form modern ministries in 1888 to the replace centuries-old disorganized Chatusadom central governance. In April 1892, the first modern Siamese cabinet was formed, consisting mostly of royal princes. Prince Damrong became Mahatthai Minister of Interior in 1892. Damrong introduced a modern bureaucracy and, in 1893, announced the establishment of the Monthon system that replaced the traditional tributary network of semi-independent rulers with numerous levels of territory-based administrative units with a centrally-appointed commissioner in charge.

Amidst these reforms, however, the French sent gunboats to threaten Bangkok in 1893, prompting Siam to cede all of Laos east of the Mekong to French Indochina. The treaty terms of October 1893 also established a 25-km demilitarized zone along the Mekong but only on the Siamese side. The major fear of the Siamese court came true when the French invaded in 1893, as the survival of Siam's sovereignty was left at the mercy of Anglo-French conflicts. As the British expressed their concerns over French advances on Siam, the Anglo-French agreement of 1896 guaranteed Siam's independence as a "buffer state" only in Siam's core territories, allowing British intervention in Southern Siam and French intervention in Eastern Siam. King Chulalongkorn embarked on his Grand European Tour in 1897 to promote the image of his kingdom as civilized and Westernized, and not a candidate for colonization. French exertion of authority over its 'French Asian subjects' in Siam, namely the Lao, Cambodian and Vietnamese, led to protracted negotiation and continuing French occupation of Chanthaburi.

After 1893, several Siamese reforms accelerated. Gustave Rolin-Jaequemyns, the king's Belgian advisor, convinced the Siamese government that contravention of Siam's sovereignty by Western powers was due to the fact that Siamese law and its legal system, dated to Ayutthaya times, were antiquated and not yet modernized. King Chulalongkorn appointed the Legislative Council in 1897, composing of Western legal specialists, to create a modern Siamese law based on the civil law system. Monthons continued to form, ending the powers of the old local lords. Integration of Lanna began in 1893 and it became a fully-fledged Monthon in 1899. The remaining Lao towns in Khorat Plateau west of the Mekong were organized into four Monthons. The Provincial Administration Act of 1897 defined the structure of the Monthon system. However, the centralizing policies were not without resistance. Numerous tribal leaders in Isan who claimed supernatural powers arose during the Holy Man's Rebellion in 1901–1902. Sultan Abdul Kadir, the last raja of Pattani, sought British support from Singapore and planned an insurgency but was caught beforehand as seven Pattani Malay sultanates were integrated into Siam in 1902. The Shan immigrants in Phrae arose in the Shan Rebellion of Phrae in 1902, declaring for Lanna traditions to be upheld and for the killing of Central Siamese officials. Chaophraya Surasak Montri however managed to put down the Shan Rebellion in 1902. In April 1905, King Chulalongkorn outright abolished slavery. Also in 1905, Chulalongkorn replaced the traditional corvée labor system with a modern universal conscription system through the Military Conscription Act of August 1905 with recruits serving for a limited time. The first modern Siamese law, the Penal Code, was promulgated in 1908. A compilation of modern Siamese law would take nearly four decades, only to be finished in 1935.The influence of the Colonial Party in Paris pressed for more Siamese concessions during the negotiations, in which Prince Devawongse was the Siamese representative. In 1904, Siam had to cede Mluprey, Champasak and Sainyabuli on the right (west) bank to France in return for French abandonment of Chanthaburi but the French proceeded to hold Trat instead. The Anglo-French Entente Cordiale in 1904 confirmed mutual recognition of Siamese independence by both powers. In 1907, French and Siamese delegates met to demarcate Franco-Siamese borders and it was decided that France returned Trat and Dansai to Siam in exchange for northwestern Cambodia; while Battambang and Siemreap was ceded to French Indochina, the French also agreed to curtail exertion over French Asian subjects in Siam. Lastly, Siam decided to relinquish the Northern Malay sultanates including Kedah, Kelantan, Terengganu and Perlis to British Malaya in the Anglo-Siamese Treaty of 1909. These lost territories were on the fringes of the Siamese sphere of influence, which Siam had only exerted some degree of control and was insignificant to the Thai aristocracy at the time, although the 1893 crisis sparked a crisis of confidence by the Thai elite on extraterritoriality, but the concept of the "lost territories" was not created until after the Siamese Revolution of 1932 by Thai military nationalists.

Modern Siam (1905–1932)

From kingdom to modern nation (1910–1925) 

One of King Chulalongkorn's reforms was to introduce a Western-style law of royal succession, so in 1910 he was peacefully succeeded by his son Vajiravudh, who reigned as Rama VI. He had been educated at Sandhurst military academy and at Oxford, and was an anglicized Edwardian gentleman. Indeed, one of Siam's problems was the widening gap between the Westernized royal family and upper aristocracy and the rest of the country. It took another 20 years for Western education to permeate the bureaucracy and the army.

There had been some political reform under Chulalongkorn, but the king was still an absolute monarch, who acted as the head of the cabinet and staffed all the agencies of the state with his own relatives. Rama VI knew that the rest of the "new" nation could not be excluded from government forever, but he had no faith in Western-style democracy. He applied his observations of the success of the British monarchy ruling India, appearing more in public and instituting more royal ceremonies. Moreover, Rama VI also carried on his father's modernization plan.

Bangkok became increasingly identified with the capital of the new nation of Siam. Rama VI's government began several nationwide development projects, despite financial hardship. New roads, bridges, railways, hospitals and schools mushroomed throughout the country with funds from Bangkok. Newly created "viceroys" were appointed to the newly restructured "regions", or monthon (circles), as the king's agents supervised administrative affairs in the provinces.

The king established the Wild Tiger Corps, or Kong Suea Pa, a paramilitary organization of Siamese people of "good character" that were united to further the nation's cause. He also created a junior branch which continues today as the National Scout Organization of Thailand. The king spent much time on the development of the movement as he saw it as an opportunity to create a bond between himself and loyal citizens. It was also a way to single out and honor his favourites. At first the Wild Tigers were drawn from the king's personal entourage, but enthusiasm among the population arose later. Of the adult movement, a German observer wrote in September 1911: "This is a troop of volunteers in black uniform, drilled in a more or less military fashion, but without weapons. The British Scouts are apparently the paradigm for the Tiger Corps. In the whole country, at the most far-away places, units of this corps are being set up. One would hardly recognize the quiet and phlegmatic Siamese." The paramilitary movement largely disappeared by 1927, but was revived and evolved into the Volunteer Defense Corps, alternatively called the Village Scouts.

Rama VI's style of government differed from that of his father. In the beginning, the king continued to employ the use of his father's entourage and there was no sudden break in the daily routine of government. Much of the running of daily affairs was therefore in the hands of experienced and competent men. To them and their staff Siam owed many progressive steps, such as the development of a national plan for the education of the whole populace, the setting up of clinics where free vaccination was given against smallpox, and the continuing expansion of railways. However, senior posts were gradually filled with members of the king's coterie when a vacancy occurred through death, retirement, or resignation. By 1915, half the cabinet consisted of new faces. Most notable was Chao Phraya Yomarat's presence and Prince Damrong's absence. He resigned from his post as Minister of the Interior officially because of ill health, but in actuality left because of friction between himself and the king.

World War I

In 1917 Siam declared war on Germany and Austria-Hungary, mainly to be in favor with the British and the French. Siam's participation in World War I secured it a seat at the Versailles Peace Conference, and Foreign Minister Devawongse used this opportunity to argue for the repeal of the 19th century treaties and the restoration of full Siamese sovereignty. The United States obliged in 1920, while France and Britain delayed until 1925. This victory gained the king some popularity, but it was soon undercut by discontent over other issues, such as his extravagance, which became more noticeable when a sharp postwar recession hit Siam in 1919. There was also concern that the king had no son, which undermined the stability of the monarchy due to the absence of heirs. Thus when Rama VI died suddenly in 1925, aged only 44, the monarchy was in a weakened state. He was succeeded by his younger brother Prajadhipok.

Transition to the 1932 revolution
Unlike other states of Southeast Asia, Thailand was never formally colonised by colonial powers, although significant territory had been ceded under duress to Britain and France. Conventional perspectives attribute this to the efforts made by the monarchs of the Chakri Dynasty, particularly Rama IV and Rama V, to "modernise" the Siamese polity, and also to the relative cultural and ethnic homogeneity of the Thai nation. Rama IV opened Siam to European trade and began the process of modernisation. His son, Rama V (King Chulalongkorn), consolidated control over Thai vassal states, creating an absolute monarchy and a centralised state. The success of the Chakri monarchs would sow the seeds of the 1932 revolution and the end of the absolute monarchy. "Modernisation" mandated from above had, by the early 20th century, created a class of Western-educated Thais in the commoner and lower nobility classes, who staffed the middle and lower ranks of the nascent Siamese bureaucracy. They were influenced by the ideals of the French and Russian Revolutions. This new faction would eventually form the People's Party, the nucleus of the 1932 revolution.

Recent scholarship offers alternative perspectives that challenge conventional views of the creation of the nation. Thongchai Winichakul's hypothesis on the emergence of the "geo-body" of Siam is widely accepted by scholars in Thai and Southeast Asian studies. Thongchai argues that the traditional Hindu-Buddhist paradigms of culture, space, governance, and power were challenged by a significantly different civilisation, arising mainly from Latin Christianity tempered by the humanism of the Enlightenment. The East became increasingly described as "barbaric", "ignorant", or "inferior". The mission to "civilise" the "barbaric Asiatics" became the raison d'être for colonialism and imperialism. The siwilai ('civilise') programme in 19th century Siam was part of a strategy the Chakri monarchy adopted to justify their country's continued existence as a legitimate independent state to fend off colonial intervention. Other components involved the spatial and political reorganisation of the Siamese polity along Western lines to strengthen the state and gain recognition from the Western powers. Thongchai argues that the tactics adopted by the Siamese state were similar to those adopted by Western colonial powers in administering their colonies. Space and power were essentially redefined by the Siamese state. Autonomous and semi-autonomous mueangs were brought under the direct control of the state by the beginning of the 20th century. Cartography was employed to define national borders, replacing the vague frontiers of the Mandala kingdoms. People were assigned to ethnic groups. To promote the new Western-inspired definitions of siwilai, the educated Siamese of the 19th century, mainly the aristocracy, began writing ethnographies thus creating their own versions of the "other" to strengthen the identity of the Siamese nation by emphasising its superiority, in contrast to the barbarity of upland tribal peoples such as the Lue and the Lahu.

These new perspectives created a politically dominant Siamese aristocracy that became increasingly powerful from the "modernisation/self-colonisation" process it initiated and directed. This seems to contradict conventional perspectives, which are based on the assumption that the Chakri absolute monarchy by the early 1930s was a relatively passive actor, due to the political weakness of Rama VI (King Vajiravudh) and Rama VII (King Prajadhipok) and crises such as the Great Depression. No longer in control of events and political developments in Siam, they were swept aside by adherents of democracy and nationalism. Revisionists counter by noting that the weaknesses of an individual monarch do not necessarily mean that the resolve and power of the traditional landed aristocracy or the so-called Sakdina aristocracy in maintaining its preeminence through upholding the political prerogatives of the absolute monarchy was in any way lessened. In their view, attributing the outbreak of the 1932 revolution largely to the beliefs and ambitions of the Western-educated promoters of the People's Party obscures the role played by the Siamese monarchy and aristocracy.

The end of absolute rule (1925–1932) 

Unprepared for his new responsibilities, all Prajadhipok had in his favor was a lively intelligence, a charming diplomacy in his dealings with others, modesty and industrious willingness to learn, and the somewhat tarnished, but still potent, allure of the crown.

Unlike his predecessor, the king diligently read virtually all state papers that came his way, from ministerial submissions to petitions by citizens. Within half a year, only three of Rama VI's twelve ministers stayed put, the rest having been replaced by members of the royal family. On the one hand, these appointments brought back men of talent and experience; on the other, it signaled a return to royal oligarchy. The king obviously wanted to demonstrate a clear break with the discredited Sixth Reign, and the choice of men to fill the top positions appeared to be guided largely by a wish to restore a Chulalongkorn-type government.

The legacy that Prajadhipok received from his elder brother were problems of the sort that had become chronic in the Sixth Reign. The most urgent of these was the economy: the finances of the state were in chaos, the budget heavily in deficit, and the royal accounts a nightmare of debts and questionable transactions. That the rest of the world was deep in the Great Depression following World War I did not help the situation either.

Virtually the first act of Prajadipok as king entailed an institutional innovation intended to restore confidence in the monarchy and government, the creation of the Supreme Council of the State. This privy council was made up of a number of experienced and competent members of the royal family, including the longtime Minister of the Interior (and Chulalongkorn's right-hand man) Prince Damrong. Gradually these princes arrogated increasing power by monopolizing all the main ministerial positions. Many of them felt it their duty to make amends for the mistakes of the previous reign, but it was not generally appreciated.

With the help of this council, the king managed to restore stability to the economy, although at a price of making a significant number of the civil servants redundant and cutting the salary of those that remained. This was obviously unpopular among the officials, and was one of the trigger events for the coup of 1932. Prajadhipok then turned his attention to the question of future politics in Siam. Inspired by the British example, the king wanted to allow the common people to have a say in the country's affairs by the creation of a parliament. A proposed constitution was ordered to be drafted, but the king's wishes were rejected by his advisers, who felt that the population was not yet ready for democracy.

Revolution

In 1932, with the country deep in depression, the Supreme Council opted to introduce cuts in spending, including the military budget. The king foresaw that these policies might create discontent, especially in the army, and he therefore convened a special meeting of officials to explain why the cuts were necessary. In his address he stated the following, "I myself know nothing at all about finances, and all I can do is listen to the opinions of others and choose the best... If I have made a mistake, I really deserve to be excused by the people of Siam."

No previous monarch of Siam had ever spoken in such terms. Many interpreted the speech not as Prajadhipok apparently intended, namely as a frank appeal for understanding and cooperation. They saw it as a sign of his weakness and evidence that a system which perpetuated the rule of fallible autocrats should be abolished. Serious political disturbances were threatened in the capital, and in April 1932 the king agreed to introduce a constitution under which he would share power with a prime minister. This was not enough for the radical elements in the army. On 24 June 1932, while the king was at the seaside, the Bangkok garrison mutinied and seized power, led by a group of 49 officers known as "Khana Ratsadon". Thus ended 800 years of absolute monarchy.

Thai political history was little researched by Western Southeast Asian scholars in the 1950s and 1960s. Thailand, as the only nominally "native" Southeast Asian polity to escape colonial conquest, was deemed to be relatively more stable as compared with other newly independent states in Southeast Asia. It was perceived to have retained enough continuity from its "traditions", such as the institution of the monarchy, to have escaped from the chaos and troubles caused by decolonisation and to resist the encroachment of revolutionary communism. By implication, this line of argument suggests the 1932 revolution was nothing more than a coup that simply replaced the absolute monarchy and its aristocracy with a commoner elite class made up of Western-educated generals and civilian bureaucrats and essentially that there was little that was revolutionary about this event. David K. Wyatt, for instance, described the period of Thai history from 1910 to 1941 as "essentially the political working out of the social consequences of the reforms of Chulalongkorn's reign". The 1932 revolution was generally characterised as the inevitable outcome of "natural consequences of forces set in motion by Rama IV and Rama V".

Government

Central government 

In the early period, Rattanakosin inherited most of the bureaucratic apparatus from the late Ayutthaya. The Siamese royal court bureaucracy centred on the six ministries. The two top prime ministers of the court were Samuha Nayok, the Prime Minister of Northern Siam who oversaw the Mahatthai or Ministry of Interior, and Samuha Kalahom, the Prime Minister of Southern Siam who oversaw the Kalahom or Ministry of Military. Below them were the Four Ministries or Chatusadom;

 Krom Vieng or Krom Phra Nakhonban, the Police Bureau, was headed by Chao Phraya Yommaraj
 Kromma Wang, the Ministry of Palatial Affairs, was headed by Chao Phraya Thamma
 Krom Khlang, the Ministry of Trade and Treasury, was headed by Chao Phraya Phrakhlang
 Kromma Tha, the 'Department of Piers', dealt with foreign trade and affairs
 Phra Khlang Sinkha, the Royal Warehouse, responsible for the tariff collection from foreign trade
 Krom Na, the Ministry of Agriculture, was headed by Chao Phraya Pollathep

Additionally there were other subsidiary departments, for example;

 Krom Suratsawadi, the Department of Conscription
 Phra Khlang Maha Sombat, the Royal Treasury
 Krom Sankhakari, the Department of Monastic Affairs

Government officials were ranked by Bandasak levels and the Sakdina. The Bandasak levels determined the official's position in the bureaucratic hierarchy (see Thai nobility). The Bandasak levels were, in descending order; Chaophraya, Phraya, Phra, Luang, Khun, Meun, Phan and Nai. The two top ministers, Samuha Nayok and Samuha Kalahom, were always ranked Chaophraya in the Bangkok period. The Four Ministers of Chatusadom were initially ranked Phraya in the reign of King Rama I, with some exceptions. They were later elevated to Chaophraya in subsequent reigns.

Sakdina is the theoretical amount of land and numerical rank accorded to an official for his position in bureaucracy, which determined the amount of production received and the severity of punishment for crime. The Sakdina of each every single government position was described in the Three Seals Law. For example, the Sakdina of Samuha Nayok, Samuha Kalahom and the Four Ministers of Chatusadom were 10,000 rai each.

Regional government 

Cities and towns in 'Siam proper', which correspond roughly to modern Central and Southern Thailand, were organized into the 'Hierarchy of Cities', in which small towns were under the jurisdiction of larger cities. There were four levels of cities, in descending order; the Mueang Ek, Mueang Tho, Mueang Tri and Mueang Chattawa. Mueang Ek was the highest level of city representing regional centre. The Mueang Eks in the Rattanakosin period were Nakhon Si Thammarat, which was the centre of Southern Siam, and Nakhon Ratchasima, which was the centre of the northeast. Phitsanulok, which had been the centre of Northern Siam, used to be Mueang Ek in the Ayutthaya period. However, Phitsanulok was largely depopulated in the early Rattanakosin due to the wars in the Thonburi period and its role as an outpost against northern Burmese invasions diminished in favor of Lanna kingdom. The cities and towns in Northern Siam were under jurisdiction of Samuha Nayok and Southern Siam under Samuha Kalahom.

The governors of cities were ranked according to the level and importance of their cities. The governors of Mueang Eks were usually ranked Chaophraya. The local bureaucracy in each city was headed by the governor. Below the governor was the vice-governor called either Palat or Tukkarat, Below the vice-governor was the deputy vice-governor called Yokkrabat. The governorship of large cities were usually passed down through generations of the same family due to that family's important role and connections in the area.

The tributary kingdoms were called Prathetsarat, each of which were political entities in its own rights and bound to Siam through the Southeast Asian political ideology of mandala system. Native culture and traditions were largely retained. The Siamese court required the periodic presentation of ceremonial golden and silver trees and the provision of other resources. In wartime, tributary kingdoms were requested to send troops or to join the war on behalf of Siam. Tributary kingdoms of the Rattanakosin included;

 Lanna Kingdom (modern Northern Thailand), which was subdivided into the Kingdoms of Chiang Mai, Lampang and Lamphun under the rule of the Chetton dynasty. The principalities of Phrae and Nan were other princedoms ruled by local dynasties.
 Lao kingdoms of Luang Phrabang, Vientiane and Champasak
 Semi-independent chiefdoms in Isan region.
 Cambodia (contested with Vietnam)
 Pattani
 Northern Malay Sultanates; Kedah (including Perlis and Setul), Kelantan and Terengganu.
The governors of large cities, in practice, were also in charge of the affairs of its adjacent tributary kingdoms. The governor of Nakhon Ratchasima was responsible for the affairs in Lao kingdoms of Vientiane and Champasak. The governor of Nakhon Si Thammarat (Ligor) was responsible for the affairs in Kedah and Kelantan. The governor of Songkhla was responsible for the affairs in Pattani and Terengganu.

Law and judiciary 
Majority of the Siamese legal corpus were lost in the Fall of Ayutthaya in 1767. Siamese authorities then relied on scattered legal manuscripts to operate. In 1804, a woman who was in relationship with another man successfully sued for divorce from her husband. The husband complained that the court ruling was unjustified and appealed the case to King Rama I. King Rama I then opinioned that the existing laws of Siam were corrupted and ordered the recompilation of Ayutthaya laws to rectify and cleanse or chamra the laws of any distortions. The physical copies were imprinted with the three seals of Mahatthai (north), Kalahom (south) and Phrakhlang (treasury), signifying that the laws affected kingdom-wide and became known as the Three Seals Law that served the Siamese kingdom for the next century. The Siamese laws had taken the Indic Mānu-Dharmaśāstra as its model.

The king was the sole legislator of the kingdom. His words were recorded and inscribed to become laws. There was no single unified judiciary department as cases were distributed among the judging courts of each ministries according to the concerning matter. For example, foreign trade disputes belonged to the Kromma Tha or Trade Ministry and land disputes belonged to Krom Na or Ministry of Agriculture. The Mahatthai maintained the appeal court that settled cases from the primary courts. Unsettled cases from outlying cities were also appealed to Bangkok. When the appeal court failed to settle the case, it would be forwarded to the king himself. Presiding over the Supreme Royal Court was a part of royal daily routines.

Siamese law court involved two sets of legal personnel: the Lukkhun or council of twelve Bramanistic jurors who possessed legal knowledge and acted only as the advisory body of consultants but held no power to judge the cases and Tralakarn or layman judges who carried out actual judgements under suggestions from the Lukkhun. The Nakhonban or Police Bureau dealt specifically with criminal cases including murder, robbery and adultery. The Nakhonban employed the trial by ordeal or judiciary tortures including compression of skull, hammering of nails and entering a large rattan ball to be kicked by an elephant. These torture methods were known as the Nakhonban creed and were used only in certain circumstances in criminal cases. Sometimes when the issues were not settled, defendants were made to dive into water or walk into fire to prove their guilty or innocence. Westerners were particularly horrified by these methods of judiciary tortures and sought to dissociate themselves from traditional Siamese inquisition, resulting in the granting of extraterritoriality to Western nations in the Bowring Treaty of 1855 and other subsequent treaties.

Economy

Pre-Burney: 1782–1826 

Due to the raging wars and population dearth, the overall productivity of Siam in the early decades of Rattanakosin remained relatively low. The Siamese economy in the early Bangkok period was based on subsistence agrarian economy. Commoners lived on the production of their lands and the central authority levied taxes as income. Land was abundant, while manpower was in shortage. Taxation and Royal Junk expenditures were the main revenues of the royal court. Traditionally, as in Ayutthaya, the royal court levied four kinds of taxes;

 Tariffs, Changkob; The royal court collected tariffs from both internal and external checkpoints called Khanon, both land and riverine, where officials inspected the commodity goods. One out of ten goods was collected by the Khanon. The Khanon also measured the width of the incoming ships to determine the size of the ship. Tariff was collected in accordance with the size of the ship, known as Phasi Pak Reua, or the measurement duties. Large ships paid more tariff. Arriving foreign traders were charged with tariffs. Phra Khlang Sinkha or the Royal Warehouse was responsible for the levy of Phasi Pak Reua on foreign merchant ships, which had been the major revenue for the royal court.
 Akon; taxes imposed on specific kinds of commodity such as rice, fruits and beverages. Rice producers were charged with two thangs of rice per one rai of agricultural land. The rice fields belonging to the nobility were exempted until the reign of King Rama III. Other specific kinds of products were levied included sugarcane, indigo, green beans, soybeans, sesame, tobacco, lemon basil, onions, turmeric, jutes, tamarinds, bananas, mangoes, betel nuts, coconuts, durians, oranges, etc. The largest Akon revenue were from the alcoholic spirit tax, fishery tax, market tax, gambling den tax, fruit orchard tax and the boat tax.
 Suai; levied from the Phrai suai who paid the tax in form of local valuables instead of serving corvee labors. Gold, lacquer, saltpeter, teak and beeswax were extracted from the hinterland regions of Khorat Plateau and the Upper Chao Phraya Basin for Bangkok. These forests products were usually sold to foreign merchants to benefit the royal court.
 Reucha; collected as fees from government procedures such as court hearings and other document procedures.

Taxes were collected in forms of commodities or currency money. Main spending of the royal court went to the Biawat or the stipends of all administrative officials and the construction of palaces and temples and firearm purchases. In the early decades of Rattanakosin, the financial situation of the royal court was in strain. In 1796, Prince Maha Sura Singahanat of the Front Palace, who received 1,000 chang annually, informed King Rama I that his share was inadequate to be distributed as Biawat to his officials. King Rama I replied that the prince should invest more in the Royal Junks to earn money. King Rama I conducted his personal trade with Qing China through the Samphao Luang or Royal Junks, in joint venture with Chinese merchants who provided the crew. Export demands on Siam had been mainly forest products such as agarwood and sappanwood. The royal court acquired valuable products from the hinterland and loaded them on the junks to be traded. Chinese merchants enhanced this process by taking the role as middlemen and shippers.

Qing China had been the main trading partner of Siam since the late Ayutthaya period. In the early nineteenth century, Qing China requested to buy rice from Siam. Traditionally, rice was the forbidden commodity due to the fact that it was the main staple and crucial to stability of the kingdom. King Rama II allowed rice to be exported to China in some rice-surplus years. Chinese settler merchants played very important roles in the development of Siamese economy in the early Rattanakosin period. In the 1810s, the Chinese introduced the technology of sugar production leading to the establishment of numerous Chinese-owned sugarcane plantations in Central Siam. Crawfurd mentioned the Chinese sugarcane plantations in ฺBang Pla Soi, Nakhon Chaisi, Bangkok and Petriu. In 1822, Siam exported more than 8 million pounds of sugar. For the first time, the export-oriented marketization took over native trade of forest products. However, the profits of the these growing agro-industries were limited to the Chinese bourgeoisie and native elite class. The sugar industry remained as the major Siamese export well into the late nineteenth century.

Burney Treaty and consequences: 1826–1855 

By the reign of King Rama II, however, the Samphao Luang or Royal Junks became less profitable due to competition with growing private sectors. Since the Ayutthaya period in the fifteenth century, the Siamese royal court had monopolized foreign trades through the Phra Khlang Sinkha or Royal Warehouse. All incoming foreign ships including European merchants should go through inspection by the Phra Khlang Sinkha and would subject to at least two duties; the general eight-percent tariff levied on merchandise goods and the Phasi Pak Reua or measurement duties that was based on the size of the ship. Crawfurd exemplified the situation in 1822 by narrating a commercial venture of British merchant brig Phoenix that brought goods from British India with the value of 24,282 ticals. Phoenix was subjected to multitudes of duties including 1,499-tical (equivalent to baht) measurement duties for ship size, 2,906 ticals for import duties and 6,477 ticals for export duties. These duties had been a major source of revenue for royal court. Moreover, Phra Khlang Sinkha would haggle and bargain for suppressed prices as foreign merchants could not trade 'restricted goods' directly with the private Siamese. Government-restricted goods in early nineteenth century included bird's nest, sappanwood, tin, peppers, timber, Malabar cardamom, lead, ivory and Hanbury's garcinia.

When the British arrived in the 1820s, they saw traditional royal monopoly as a hindrance and implied that free trade should be the better agreement. This culminated in the arrival of Henry Burney and the promulgation of the Burney Treaty in June 1826, which ended three centuries of royal monopoly by granting the rights to the British to trade privately. However, some trade restrictions remained. Rice and ammunition were not permitted to be traded freely and British merchandise ships were still required to go through the Phra Khlang Sinkha for the measurement duties imposition.

King Rama III, who ascended the throne in 1824, faced major financial problems. The Burney Treaty of 1826, which terminated royal trade monopoly, took drastic effect on the royal court revenue. King Rama III then realized that, instead of relying on the Royal Junks, the royal court should rather invest in tax farming. In his reign, thirty-eight new taxes were enacted to compensate the revenue loss. New tax farms required experienced collectors and the Chinese eagerly filled in these roles, leading to the creation of 'Chinese tax collector system'. When a new tax was announced, the Chinese merchants would compete for the rights to collect the tax on behalf of royal court. Those who promised highest amount of income would win this 'tax auction'. Deprived government revenues and decline in Chinese tributary trade in the 1840s pushed Siamese court towards more isolationist and conservative policies. Chinese tax farming system re-imposed restrictions and tariffs on most trades. British delegate Sir James Brooke, who argued that the Burney Treaty had not been honored by Siam, arrived in Bangkok in 1850 to find the Siamese court opposing any further concessions. In 1850, few years prior to the Bowring Treaty, Siam's total export value was around 5.6 million baht, with more than fifty percent came from natural products and fifteen percent from sugar export.

Bowring Treaty and consequences: 1855–1873 

Facing geopolitical pressures, Siamese government under liberal-minded King Mongkut and Chaophraya Si Suriyawong (Chuang Bunnag) gave in to British demands with the signing of Bowring Treaty in 1855. General import tariff was reduced and fixed at three percent ad valorem, which was lower than other Asian states including China's five percent and Japan's five percent, on all items except for opium and bullion. Phasi Pak Ruea or measurement duties, which was based on ship size, was abolished and incoming merchant ships were levied for duties only once along the course of trade venture, whether import or export. The rice export, which had been previously restricted due to concerns of national security, was liberalized. Revolutionary effect of Bowring Treaty was that Siamese economy was liberalized as never been before, shifting away from traditional subsistence to export-oriented economy, expanded in market volume and integrated into world economy. Rice arose to become the top export commodity, leading to rapid expansion of rice fields in Central Siam. Siam exported 60,000 tons of rice in 1857 and became one of the world's leading rice exporters in the 1860s as rice was mostly shipped to Hong Kong and Singapore. Increasing rice export put the raise on incentives of rice producers who worked more lands and produced more crop than that was simply to feed themselves. Another effect was the beginning of disparity of wealth between Central Siam and inner hinterlands when Central Siam flourished from new economies but the hinterlands, which had earlier depended on forest product trade through Central Siam, declined. Bowring Treaty also forced decriminalization of opium, which had been outlawed since 1809, in Siam.

Trade agreements of Bowring Treaty and other 'unequal treaties' with Western nations also took detrimental effects on Siamese government revenues. Traditional trade tariffs was sacrificed in order to preserve the kingdom's security in regards of colonial threats. This put Siamese government in dire financial situation even in the time that Siam's economy was expanding and led to creation of fourteen even more tax farms in the reign of King Mongkut for Chinese collectors to levy. Numerous and disorganized taxes were scattered across many departments, which were under control of nobility who benefitted from their tax collection responsibilities. Largest taxes, opium tax and alcohol tax, belonged to the Bunnag-led Kalahom and Kromma Tha. Nobles responsible for tax collection treated tax farms under their control as their own properties and sought to limit their payment to government treasury at fixed rate. Government revenues were not effectively harnessed from this deranged taxation system and led to fiscal reforms by King Chulalongkorn in 1873.

Currency 

Rattanakosin Kingdom used the silver bullet money known as Photduang as currency until it was officially replaced with flat coins in 1904. Photduang originated in the Sukhothai period and had been in use through the Ayutthaya period. A silver bar was cut into discrete units of weight, which were melted and cast into strips that were bent to curve in the form of curled worms – hence the name Photduang meaning 'curled worm'. Photduang bullet coins were imprinted with the Chakra Seal, which was the kingdom seal, on one side and the regal seal of each reign on other side. King Rama I had the Unalom Lotus Seal imprinted on the Photduang of his reign. King Rama II used the garuda seal. The seal of King Rama III was in the shape of a palace. The weight units of Photduang were Tamleung (60 g of silver), Baht (15 g), Salueng (quarter of Baht), Fueang (half of Saleung) and Phai (quarter of Fueang).

Different currencies were used in Lanna and Lao Kingdoms. In Laos, the Lat silver bars were used. Photduang were also accepted in those regions.

Though Photduang currency existed, the barter exchange remained prevalent. In the reign of King Rama II, the royal court distributed Biawat stipends to government officials in the form of white clothes. Some taxes were collected in form of commodity products.

Before Bowring Treaty of 1855, most Siamese economic transactions were done through barter exchange. After Bowring, the Siamese economy expanded in scale and led to monetization of the economy. Cash in the forms of Mexican real, Dutch guilder, Indian rupee, Japanese and Vietnamese coins flooded into Siam. Siamese people were reluctant to switch to coin usage and stuck with their Photduang. Foreign coins were melted and re-cast into Photduang silver bullets. However, casting of Photduang required craftsmanship and did not meet the demands of Siam's growing economy. Government had to declare foreign coins legal for usage inside Siam in 1857. During the Siamese Mission to London in 1857, Queen Victoria gifted a coin-minting machine to Siamese court, leading to establishment of minting house in royal treasury department. ฺThree British engineers arrived in Siam with the machine in 1857 but all three of them died soon from fever, drowning and cholera, leaving the machine unoperated. King Mongkut then had to assign a native Siamese nobleman named Moed to learn operation of minting machine. First Siamese machine-minted coinage was issued in 1860. It took time for Siamese society to accept modern coin usage and traditional Photduang was used concurrently.

Diplomacy

Qing China 
Siam had entered the Chinese tributary relationship system, in which the Chinese imperial court recognized the rulers of Siam to maintain relations, since Sukhothai and Ayutthaya periods. Siamese missions to the Chinese imperial court were called Chim Kong (進貢 POJ: chìn-kòng  "to offer gifts"). The Chinese Emperors conferred the Hong investitures (封 Peng'im: hong1 ) on Siamese monarchs as Siamlo Kok Ong (暹羅國王). Siamese kings did not consider themselves as submitted tributary rulers but rather as amicable gift exchangers, while the Chinese court would construe this as vassal homage from Siam. Entering the tributary relationship with China permitted the Siamese royal court to conduct lucrative commercial activities there. The Siamese court presented commodities ascribed by the imperial court as tributes to the Chinese Emperor who, in return, granted luxurious goods, which were more valuable than Siamese presented goods, in exchange. The Siamese mission to China was a profitable expenditure in itself in the view of Siamese royal court. The tributary relation with China did not have political implications in Siam as the Beijing court wielded little to no influence over Siam.

Kings of the Chakri dynasty of the early Rattanakosin period continued the tradition of Chim Kong. The Siamese court of Bangkok was officially recognized and invested title by the Qing court in 1787. Siam sent tributes to China once every three years. The Chakri kings used the family name "Zheng" (鄭), which was the family name of King Taksin, in diplomatic letters to China. Chinese imperial court granted the Lokto Seal (駱駝 ) to the Siamese king in recognition. The jaded Lokto Seal bore Chinese letters Siamlo Kok Ong with the handle sculpted in the shape of camel. On each mission, the Siamese envoys presented three letters to the Chinese court;

 The royal letter to the Chinese Emperor inscribed on a golden plate
 The Khamhap (勘合 ) letter bearing the Lokto Seal and Siamese Royal Seal
 The letter from Phrakhlang the Minister of Trade with the Lotus Seal of Ministry of Trade and the Royal Seal

The Lokto Seal served as confirmation of validity of the Siamese mission. Siamese envoys to China were hailed from the Kromma Tha Sai ( 'Department of the Left Pier') that dealt with Chinese affairs and were usually Chinese-speakers themselves. The mission consisted of three dignitaries; the First Envoy Rachathut, the Second Envoy Upathut, the Third Envoy Trithut and two translators; Thongsue and Pansue. The Siamese mission took maritime journey to Guangzhou, where Chinese officials verified the Lokto. The Siamese mission then proceeded by land to Beijing.

By the 1830s, the Chinese junk trades declined. In 1839, Emperor Daoguang ordered Siam to send tributes once every four years instead of three years. The Treaty of Nanking of 1842, in the aftermath of First Opium War, abolished the Canton system and the British took over maritime trade in Asia. The Sino-Siamese trades shifted from junk trades based on the Chim Kong to the free trades using British cargoes. Upon his ascension, King Mongkut dispatched a Chim Kong mission to China in 1851. The mission was rejected at Guangzhou on the grounds that Emperor Xienfeng was in mourning for his father Emperor Daoguang. Another mission was re-dispatched in 1852. However, the mission was robbed by local Chinese bandits and the Pansue translator was killed. King Mongkut then asserted that the Chim Kong tradition might give misguided impression that Siam had been under political suzerainty of China and was inappropriate for an independent sovereign kingdom to conduct. King Mongkut then ordered the Chim Kong to be discontinued in 1863. The Chim Kong of 1852 was the last Siamese tribute mission to China in history.

Kandyan Kingdom 

The Sri Lankan Kingdom of Kandy or Kandyan Kingdom, which also followed Theravada Buddhism as state religion, established diplomatic religious relation with Siam in 1753 in Ayutthaya period when Singhalese envoys arrived requesting for Siamese Buddhist monks to revitalize Buddhism in Sri Lanka. In 1815, King Rama II dispatched the religious mission to Sri Lanka. The mission to Lanka was under the responsibility of Siamese monkhood. Venerable and learned monks were selected to embark on the mission. Phraya Nakhon Noi arranged for the monks to board an Indian ship from Nakhon Si Thammarat to Sri Lanka. By that time, Sri Lanka had no king as the Singhalese Radala nobility had agreed to the British rule in the Kandyan Convention. The Siamese religious envoys reached Kandy, which was called "Singkhan" in Thai language, in 1815. They were received by the native Singhalese Radala and monkhood and worshipped the Temple of the Tooth at Kandy and other religious sites. Siamese monks were also taken to visit Robert Brownrigg the British governor of Ceylon in Colombo. The envoys left Sri Lanka in 1816 and returned to Siam.

King Mongkut sent another religious mission to Sri Lanka in 1852. The mission reached Galle, where they were received by the native Singhalese. Siamese monks delivered sermons to the Singhalese people. However, the Siamese monks failed to obtain the permission of British colonial government in time to travel to Kandy to worship the Temple of the Tooth and returned.

Portugal 

After the Fall of Ayutthaya in 1767, the surviving Portuguese community moved to settle on the West bank of Chao Phraya River in Thonburi in the Kudi Chin district around the Santa Cruz church. In 1786, a Portuguese envoy named Antonio de Veesent from Macau arrived in Bangkok, bearing the royal letter of Queen Maria I of Portugal from Lisbon. King Rama I offered permission to open a trading post in Bangkok in exchange for firearms supply.

In 1820, Carlos Manuel de Silviera arrived from the Portuguese Macau. A treaty was signed in which King Rama II granted a piece of land on the East bank of Chao Phraya river that used to be the residence of Nguyễn Phúc Ánh to be a feitoria or Portuguese trading post, which later became the Portuguese Consulate in Bangkok and modern Portuguese Embassy. Carlos Manuel de Silviera was appointed as the Portuguese Consul General to Siam in 1820. This was the first official contact between Siam and a Western nation in the Rattanakosin period. The Portuguese Consulate was the first Western Consulate in Bangkok and the only one before the reign of King Mongkut. The new Portuguese community centred on the Holy Rosary church or Calvário church. De Silviera was granted the title Luang Aphaiwanit by the Siamese king. The Portuguese filled in Siamese court functionaries as shipmasters, translators and harbour master of Paknam.

However, further development of Portuguese trades with Siam did not succeed as no other official Portuguese missions visited Bangkok. De Silviera left Bangkok in 1829 and the consulate was demoted to mere agency until it was restored in 1832. Several vacancy periods were filled by Portuguese local merchants serving as honorary consuls.

British Empire

Early Contacts: 1822–1855 

In 1821, Marquess of Hastings the Governor-General of India sent John Crawfurd to Siam. Also in 1821, Phraya Nakhon Noi the "Raja of Ligor" invaded and occupied the sultanate of Kedah resulting in Sultan Ahmad Tajuddin Halim Shah taking refuge in the British-held Penang. The British at Penang were concerning about Siamese presence in Kedah when Crawfurd arrived on the island in 1822. Crawfurd arrived in Bangkok in 1822. There was no English translators in Siamese court so the British messages were translated into Portuguese then into Malay and into Thai. Crawfurd proposed tariff reduction. Phraya Phrakhlang (Dit Bunnag) asked to acquire firearms for Siam. Crawfurd, however, said that the British would sell firearms on conditions that Siam "were at peace with the friends and neighbours of the British nation", indirectly referring to Burma. Siamese court, whose main concern in dealings with Western powers was to purchase firearms to be used in Burmese Wars, were dissatisfied. The final straw came when Crawfurd delivered the personal letter of the Kedah sultan to King Rama II, complaining Nakhon Noi as the source of his discontents. The negotiations were effectively soured. Crawfurd eventually departed for Saigon later that year.

Despite the events during his mission in 1822, Crawfurd remained in contact with the Siamese court as the Resident of Singapore. In the First Anglo-Burmese War in 1824, Crawfurd informed Siam that the British Empire was at war with Burma and requested Siamese aid. King Rama III then assigned Siamese troops led by the Mon commander Chaophraya Mahayotha to assist the British in Tenasserim Region. However, the 'Mergui Incident' in 1825, in which Siamese and British commanders argued over the deportation of people of Mergui, prompted King Rama III to withdraw all troops from Burma. Lord Amherst then sent Henry Burney to Bangkok in 1825. Henry Burney arrived at Ligor where he was escorted by Nakhon Noi to Bangkok in 1826. Agreements were reached and the Burney Treaty was signed in June 1826. Burney Treaty ended traditional Siamese royal court monopoly by allowing the British to trade freely and privately, in which the British accepted of Siamese domination over Kedah.

The Burney Treaty also offered the British some disadvantages. The British in Siam, who were horrified by the Nakhonban methods of judiciary tortures, were still subjected to Siamese laws and court. The infamous Phasi Pak Reua or the measurement duties were still intact. After the First Opium War in 1842, the British came to dominate maritime trade in Asia and the British pushed for more free trades. Siamese court introduced the Chinese tax collector system, in which Chinese merchants would 'auction' for new commodity taxes and levy the taxes on behalf of government. This new taxation system effectively re-imposed trade barriers in the 1840s. James Brooke the governor of Labuan arrived in 1850 to amend agreements. However, his proposals were vehemently rejected by Siamese trade officials. Brooke even suggested gunboat diplomacy but eventually left empty-handed. It was not until the Bowring Treaty of 1855 that the British rhetorical demands were achieved.

Post-Bowring: 1855–1868 

The new king Mongkut, who had ascended the throne in 1851 and his minister Chaophraya Si Suriyawong (Chuang Bunnag) embraced more liberal policies than their predecessors. Sir John Bowring the Governor of Hong Kong, who was the delegate of Aberdeen government in London rather than the East India Company,  arrived in Bangkok in March 1855 along with Harry Parkes in the ship Rattler. Si Suriyawong, called 'Kralahom', was an advocate of free trade principles. Though free trade proposals were initially opposed by Somdet Chaophraya 'Ong Noi' Phichaiyat, agreements were reached and Bowring Treaty was signed in April 1855. Harry Parkes brought drafted agreement to London where Law Officers of the Crown pushed for clarifications of some vagueness, leading to the 'Supplementary Agreement of 1856'. Parkes returned to Bangkok with ratifications exchanged in 1856. Bowring Treaty reduced and fixed general standard tariff at three percent and granted extraterritoriality to British subjects in Siam who would subject to British consular authority and British law rather than Siamese judiciary system. The British were also allowed land ownership in area within 24-hour journey from Bangkok. Charles Hillier became the first British consul in Bangkok in 1856 but he died soon four months later. King Mongkut granted a land on Chao Phraya River bank next to Portuguese Consulate to be British Consulate.

King Mongkut sent a Siamese mission, led by Phraya Montri Suriyawong (Chum Bunnag), boarding on British ship Encounter, to London in 1857. This mission was the first Siamese mission to Europe since the last one in Ayutthaya Period in 1688. The envoys had audience with Queen Victoria in November 1857. Robert Schomburgk arrived in 1857 to take the consul position in Bangkok. Schomburgk, himself a naturalist, visited Chiangmai in 1859–60 to explore possible ways to connect to Isthmus of Kra.

Sultan Mahmud Muzaffar Shah of Riau-Lingga was deposed by the Dutch in 1857. Also in 1857, Pahang Civil War, which pitted Raja Bendahara Tun Mutahir of Pahang, who was supported by British Straits Settlements, against his brother Wan Ahmad, erupted. Wan Ahmad allied with Mahmud Muzaffar, who also allied with Sultan Baginda Omar of Terengganu due to familial relations. Mahmud Muzaffar came to reside in Bangkok in 1861. In 1862, Mahmud Muzaffar, telling Siamese court that he was to visit his mother in Terengganu, procured a Siamese ship to Terengganu. William Cavenagh the governor of Straits Settlements was greatly alarmed by Siamese intervention as it would broaden the war. Cavenagh demanded that Siam retrieve Mahmud Muzaffar back to Bangkok and sent gunboats to Kuala Terengganu, pressing the Terengganu sultan to surrender. When Terengganu did not yield, British warships bombarded Terengganu, leaving fires and damages. Mahmud Muzaffar eventually returned to Siam. As Terengganu was Siam's tributary state, Chaophraya Thiphakorawong (Kham Bunnag) the Phrakhlang protested the incident to London, urging for investigation. British parliament criticized Cavenagh for his attacks on 'friendly town' and instructed British naval commanders not to attack without orders of the Admiralty.

British India had acquired Lower Burma in aftermath of the Second Anglo-Burmese War in 1852. In 1866, after difficulties, British India sent a special commissioner Edward O'Riley to meet with Siamese delegate Phraya Kiat the Mon officer at Three Pagodas Pass in 1866 to explore and demarcate Anglo-Siamese borders between Siam and British Burma in Tenasserim Hills from Salween River to Andaman Sea. Border agreement treaty was signed in 1868, becoming definition of modern Myanmar-Thailand borders.

Thomas George Knox: 1868–1879 

Thomas George Knox arrived in Siam in 1851 when he was hired by Vice-King Pinklao to train modernizing Front Palace armies. Knox married a Tavoyan woman and had children with her including his daughter Fanny Knox. Thomas Knox then switched to diplomatic career, becoming vice-consul in 1857, consul in 1865 and consul-general in 1868. Acquainted with Siamese elite circle, Knox politically supported Pinklao and his lineage and became rather an ally of Si Suriyawong. With ascension of King Chulalongkorn in 1868 under regency of Si Suriyawong, Prince Wichaichan, Pinklao's son, was made Vice-King of Front Palace. When Knox was away in 1868, Chinese-Siamese tax collectors burnt down some British opium houses in Bangkok. Henry Alabaster the acting consul pressed for compensation from Siamese court. Si Suriyawong, who was the patron of tax collectors, vehemently defended his subordinates. When Knox returned, he ruled in favor of Si Suriyawong. The disgraced Alabaster resigned and left Siam. King Chulalongkorn assumed personal rule in 1873 and appointed Henry Alabaster, nemesis of Si Suriyawong, to be his royal advisor. During the Front Palace Crisis in 1874-75, when Knox was absent again, the acting consul Newman acted in concert with Knox's interest to support and provide shelter to Prince Wichaichan in British consulate. When Sir Andrew Clarke the governor of Straits Settlements, who had earlier maintained cordial correspondences with King Chulalongkorn, arrived in February 1875 to mediate the conflicts, he reversed British stance on the situation, favoring Chulalongkorn and forcing Wichaichan to accept humiliating terms instead.

Fanny Knox, daughter of Thomas Knox, married her lover Phra Pricha Konlakarn, a promising young Siamese nobleman, in 1878. Pricha Konlakarn and his father, Mot Amatyakul, had been by the king's side in political opposition against Si Suriyawong. By marrying to Pricha Konlakarn, Fanny Knox crossed factional division line and upset Si Suriyawong who intended to marry one of Bunnag gentlemen to her to cement alliance with consul Knox. Pricha's marriage drew ire from Siamese elite society as marrying Westerner was frowned upon at the time and required king's consent. Pricha Konlakarn had overseen a royal gold mine project. However, his abuses led to deaths of his workers. Local workers filed the case against Pricha Konlakarn with embezzlement and murder. Si Suriyawong, out of political motives, pushed for death penalty of Pricha as corruption on royal revenue was punishable by death. Thomas Knox, in desperate attempt to save Pricha Konlakarn for the sake of his daughter, brought British gunboat Foxhound to Bangkok to force the release of his son-in-law. Despite Knox's interjection, Pricha Konlakarn was sentenced to death and executed in November 1879. Thomas Knox, after his fourteen years of tenure, was relieved of his consul position in 1879 for his improper exercise of power and the Knox family left Siam. These incidents prompted King Chulalongkorn to send a mission to London in 1880 to explain the incident.

France 

Franco-Siamese relations terminated after Siamese revolution of 1688 in Ayutthaya Period. The French maintained low-level presence in Siam through French missionary works. In 1856, Charles de Montigny arrived in Bangkok, with the aid of Jean-Baptiste Pallegoix the vicar apostolic of Siam, to conclude Franco-Siamese Treaty of 1856 that, in similar manner to British Bowring Treaty, granted low tariff and extraterritoriality to the French. Comte de Castelnau became the first French consul in Bangkok. King Mongkut sent a mission led by Phraya Siphiphat (Phae Bunnag) to Paris in 1861, where they had audience with Emperor Napoleon III.

After the French had acquired Cochinchina in 1862, they took over Vietnam's position in competing against Siam and were proved to be expansionist colonial power. Earlier in 1860, King Ang Duong of Cambodia had died, resulting in civil war between Norodom and his brother Si Votha. Pierre-Paul de La Grandière the governor of French Cochinchina sailed to Oudong in 1863, persuading Norodom to sign a treaty to make Cambodia a French protectorate without Siam's acknowledgement. Gabriel Aubaret assumed consular position in Bangkok in 1864. The French urged Siam to release Cambodian royal regalia for Norodom. Siam sent Phraya Montri Suriyawong (Chum Bunnag), accompanied by French Consul Aubaret, to bring Cambodian regalia to Oudong in June 1864, where French admiral Desmoulins placed Cambodian crown onto Norodom, signifying French authority over Cambodia. However, Chaophraya Si Suriyawong the Kralahom had earlier secretly had Norodom sign another opposing treaty that recognized Siamese suzerainty over Cambodia, which was published in The Straits Times in August 1864. Aubaret was embarrassed at the existence of such opposing treaty. The French sought to annul Cambodian-Siamese treaty and Aubaret brought gunboat Mitraille to Bangkok in 1864. Compromise agreement draft between Siam and France was brought by Aubaret to Paris to be ratified in 1865. However, ratification was delayed at Paris due to prospect that France would have to accept Siamese claims over 'Siamese Laos' – France's future colonial ambitions. Siam sent another mission to Paris, led by Phraya Surawong Waiyawat (Won Bunnag), in 1865 to settle Cambodian issue disputes and to attend Exposition Universelle. The treaty was finally ratified in July 1867. Earlier Cambodian-Siamese treaty was annulled as Siam officially ceded Cambodia to France but retained northwestern Cambodia including Battambang and Siemreap. The treaty also allowed the French to navigate the Mekong in Siamese territories, leading to French Mekong expedition of 1866–1868.

United States 

Edmund Roberts was appointed by President Andrew Jackson as the American envoy to the Far East in 1831. After visiting Canton and Danang, Roberts arrived in Bangkok in 1833 on the US Sloop-of-war Peacock. Roberts met and negotiated with Chao Phraya Phrakhlang. The draft of Treaty of Amity and Commerce, which became known as the 'Roberts Treaty', was presented to King Rama III in 1833. The Roberts Treaty was the first treaty between United States and an Asian nation and Siam became the first Asian nation to come into official relations with United States. The content of the treaty was largely in the same manner as the British Burney Treaty. Difference between the American Roberts Treaty and British Burney Treaty was that the United States required to be granted the same prospective benefits as other Western nations. If Siam reduced the tariffs of any other Western nations, the United States would be eligible for the same rights. If Siam allowed any other Western nations but the Portuguese to establish a consulate, the Americans would also be allowed. The treaty also stipulated that if an American failed to pay Siamese debts or bankrupted, the Siamese would not punish or hold the American debtor as slave.

However, the Chinese tax collector system imposed many tariffs in the 1840s that rendered trade much less profitable. No American merchants ship sailed to Bangkok from 1838 to 1850. Like the British, the Americans later requested for amendments of the initial treaty. Joseph Balestier, a French man who became American diplomat, arrived in Bangkok in 1850 to propose the amendments. Phrakhlang (Dit Bunnag), the usual receiver of Western envoys, had been away conducting the Sak Lek in Southern Siam. Phrakhlang's younger brother Phraya Siphiphat (That Bunnag) took over the task of receiving Joseph Balestier. However, the meetings were not friendly ones. According to Thai chronicles, Balestier behaved unceremoniously. Phraya Siphiphat rejected any proposals to modify the existing treaty. Balestier even did not manage to deliver the presidential letter. When Phrakhlang returned, Balestier complained to him that his younger brother Siphiphat had offended him as the envoy of the President of the United States but Phrakhlang did not respond. Eventually, Balestier left Bangkok empty-handed.

Townsend Harris, on his way to Japan, arrived in Siam in April 1856 on San Jacinto to conclude a new treaty. Arrival of Harris was at the same time when British Harry Parkes had been negotiating supplementary terms of Bowring Treaty. Reception of the American envoy was delayed to due Siamese court preventing the British and the American to meet and join efforts to demand further concessions. Harris presented gifts from President Franklin Pierce to Siamese court and asserted to Vice-King Pinklao that the United States "had no territory in the East and desired none". Siamese Harris Treaty, based on Bowring Treaty and signed in May 1856, granted similar rights to the Americans including low tariff and extraterritoriality. Stephen Matoon was hired as the first American consul in Bangkok. Compared to the British and the French, the United States had little interest in Siam. J.H. Chandler succeeded as American consul in Bangkok in 1859. King Mongkut sent a letter to President Abraham Lincoln in 1861, suggesting that Siam would gift elephants to be beasts of burden, in which President Lincoln politely declined, stating that "steam has been our best and most efficient agent of transportation in internal commerce".

Demography 
The Siamese effective manpower had been in decline since the late Ayutthaya period. The Fall of Ayutthaya in 1767 was the final blow as most Siamese were either deported to Burma or perished in war. The manpower shortage of Siam was exemplified during the Nine Armies' War in 1785, in which Burma sent the total number of 144,000 men to invade Siam who managed to only gather 70,000 men for defenses. D.E. Malloch, who accompanied Henry Burney to Bangkok in 1826, noted that Siam was thinly populated and the Siamese lands could support about twice the size of its population.

Manpower management 
Manpower had been a scarce resource during the early Bangkok period. The Department of Conscription or Registers, the Krom Suratsawadi, was responsible for the record-keeping of able-bodied men eligible for corvée and wars. Krom Suratsawadi recorded the Hangwow registers – a list of available Phrai commoners and That slaves to be drafted into services. However, pre-modern Siam did not maintain an accurate census of its population. The survey by the court focused on the recruitment of capable manpower not for statistical intelligence. Only able-bodied men were counted on that purpose, excluding women and children and those who had escaped from authority to live in the wilderness of jungles.

The authority of Siamese government extended only to the towns and riverine agricultural lands. Most of the pre-modern Siamese lands were dense tropical jungles roamed by wild animals. Leaving the town for jungles was the most effective way to avoid the corvée obligations for Siamese men. The Siamese court devised the method of Sak Lek to strictly control the available manpower. The man would be branded with the heated iron cast to create an imprinting tattoo on the back of his hand in the symbol of his responsible department. The Sak Lek enabled prompt identification and prevented the Phrai from escaping government duties. The Sak Lek was traditionally conducted once in a generation, usually once per reign and within Central Siam. King Rama III ordered the Sak Lek of Laos in 1824, which became one of the preceding events of the Anouvong's Lao Rebellion in 1827. Sak Lek of Southern Siamese people were conducted in 1785, 1813 and 1849. Effective manpower control was one of major policies of the Siamese court in order to maintain stability and security.

Population 
Surviving sources on the accurate population of pre-modern Siam does not exist. Only through the estimated projections that the demographic information of pre-modern Siam was revealed. In the first century of the Rattanakosin period, the population of what would become modern Thailand remained relatively static at around 4 million people. Fertility rate was high but life expectancy was averaged to be less than 40 years with infant mortality rate as high as 200 per 1,000 babies. Wars and diseases were major causes of deaths. Men were periodically drafted into warfare. Siamese children died from smallpox yearly and the Cholera epidemics of 1820 and 1849 had claimed 30,000 and 40,000 deaths, respectively.

Bangkok was founded in 1782 as the royal seat and became the primate city of Siam. Bangkok inherited the founding population from Thonburi, which had already been enhanced by the influx of Lao and Cambodian war captives and Chinese and Mon immigrants. Through the early Rattanakosin period, the population of Bangkok was estimated to be around 50,000 people. Chinese immigration was the greatest contributor to the population of Bangkok and Central Siam. By the 1820s, Bangkok had surpassed all other cities in Siam in population size. Others estimated population of major town centres in Central Siam in 1827 included Ayutthaya at 41,350, Chanthaburi at 36,900, Saraburi at 14,320 and Phitsanulok at 5,000 people. Within the Siamese sphere of influence, Chiang Mai was the second most populated city in Rattanakosin Kingdom after Bangkok.

Much of the western provinces of Siam were depopulated for several decades until the early 19th century due to the near-constant state of fighting with Burma. Succeeding Ayutthaya, the major Siamese city of Phitsanulok (another principal city of the former Ayutthaya Kingdom) was razed by the Burmese during the Burmese–Siamese War (1775–1776) in 1775. The Burmese–Siamese War (1809–1812), the last invasion into Siam by Burma, caused the depopulation of Phuket Island for several decades, and the destruction of Thalang, Phuket's then-main town, eventually to be overtaken by the new settlement of Phuket, as the island's resurgence as a tin mine settlement.

Ethnic immigration 

Since the Thonburi period, Siam had acquired ethnic population through many campaigns against the neighbouring kingdoms. Ethnic war captives were forcibly relocated. In 1779, when the Siamese forces took Vientiane during the Thonburi period, ten thousands of Lao people from Vientiane were deported to settle in Central Siam in Saraburi and Ratchaburi where they were known as the Lao Vieng. The Lao elite class, including the princes who were the sons of the Lao king, were settled in Bangkok. In 1804, the Siamese-Lanna forces captured the Burmese-held Chiang Saen. Northern Thai inhabitants of Chiang Saen, which were by that time known as "Lao Phung Dam" (the black bellied Lao), were relocated down south to settle in Saraburi and Ratchaburi. The greatest influx of Lao people came in 1828 after the total destruction of Vientiane, which was estimated to be more than 100,000 people. Through the early nineteenth century, there was a gradual Lao population shift from the Mekong region to the Chi-Mun Basin of Isan, leading to the foundation of numerous towns in Isan. In 1833, during the Siamese-Vietnamese War, the Siamese forces took control of Muang Phuan and its whole Phuan population were deported to Siam in order to curb Vietnamese influence. The Lao Phuan people were settled in Central Siam.

During one of the civil wars in Cambodia in 1782, King Ang Eng and his Cambodian retinue were settled in Bangkok. In 1783, Nguyễn Phúc Ánh took refuge and settled in Bangkok along with his Vietnamese followers. Cambodians were deported to Siam in Siamese-Vietnamese conflict events of 1812 and 1833. They were settled in Bangkok and the Prachinburi area. In 1833, during the Siamese expedition to Cochinchina, Christian Vietnamese and Cambodians from Cochinchina were taken to settle in Bangkok in Samsen.

Due to the insurgencies of Malay tributary states against Siam, Malays were deported as war captives to Bangkok on several occasions. In 1786, when Pattani was sacked, the Pattani Malays were deported to settle in Bangkok at Bang Lamphu. In the 1830s, Pattani and Kedah rebellions prompted deportations of 4,000 to 5,000 Malays from the south to settle on the eastern suburbs of Bangkok known as Saensaep and at Nakhon Si Thammarat in the aftermath.

After the Fall of Hanthawaddy Kingdom in 1757, the Mon people of Lower Burma suffered from genocide by the Burmese and had taken refuge in Siam since the late Ayutthaya period. Another failed Mon rebellion caused an influx of Mon people in 1774 in Thonburi period. In 1814, Mon people of Martaban rose up against an oppressive Burmese governor and the 40,000 of Mon people migrated through the Three Pagodas Pass to Siam. King Rama II sent his young son Prince Mongkut to welcome the Mons at Kanchanaburi on that occasion.

Chinese immigration was the greatest contributor to the population growth of Central Siam. They were increasingly integrated into Siamese society over time. Crawfurd mentioned 31,500 male registered Chinese taxpayers in Bangkok in his visit in 1822. Malloch stated that, during his stay in 1826, 12,000 Chinese people arrived in Siam annually from Guangdong and Fujian Provinces. The Chinese settlers were adorned with special treatment by the royal court. Unlike other ethnicities, the Chinese were spared from corvée obligations and wartime drafts on the condition that they paid a certain amount of tax known as Phuk Pee. Once the tax was paid, they were given an amulet to be tied around their wrists as the symbol. The first Phuk Pee was conducted in the reign of King Rama II. The Chinese settlers played a very important role in the development of Siamese economy in the early Bangkok period. The unrestricted Chinese were free to move around the kingdom, serving as commercial middlemen and became the first ‘bourgeoisie’ class of Siam.

Society 
Despite important political changes, the traditional Siamese society in the early Rattanakosin period remained largely unchanged from the Ayutthaya period. Theravada Buddhism served as the main ideology on which the societal principles were based. The king and the royal dynasty stood atop of the social pyramid. Below him was the common populace who were either the Nai, who were the leader of their subordinates and held official posts, or Phrai commoners and That slaves, though there were substantial degree of social mobility. Ethnic immigrants became Phrai and That also, with the exception of the Chinese who had paid the Phuk Pee tax.

Sakdina was the theoretical and numerical rank accorded to every men of all classes in the kingdom, except the king himself, as described in the Three Seals Law. Sakdina determined each man's exact level in the social hierarchy. For example, the Sakdina of the nobility ranged from 400 rai to 10,000 rai each. The Sakdina of a basic Buddhist monk was 400 rai. The Sakdina of a slave was 5 rai. The traditional Siamese society was roughly stratified into four distinct social classes;

 The royalty, Chao; including the king and the royal family
 The nobility, Khunnang; The nobility referred to any men who held a government position with the Sakdina of 400 rai or more and his family. Siamese bureaucratic positions were not hereditary, though some positions were conserved among prominent lineages due to familial and personal connections. The nobility were the Nai who controlled Phrai subordinates. A noble and his family were exempted from the corvée. The distinction between the Lower Nobility and the commoners were indecisive. Commoners, at times, were appointed to the nobility by volunteering himself as a leader of a group. The Siamese court recruited officials through personal connections. Any noblemen who wished to start his bureaucratic career should give himself into the service of one of the existing superiors to win the favor and support. Through the recommendations and connections of that superior, the novice official would find his place the bureaucracy. The system of connections maintained the noble status among the connected individuals, though the nobility class itself was not inclusive. Nobles received Biawat stipends as income. When a noble died, his belongings and estates were organized and reported to the royal court who would take a part of the wealth as inheritance tax.

The royalty and the nobility, who had authority over and commanded the commoners, were collectively called Munnai.

 Commoners, Phrai; Phrai commoners constituted the majority of the population and were under the control of Munnai. They were mostly agricultural producers. All able-bodied male Phrai, excluding the people of tributary kingdoms, were required to periodically serve the royal court in corvée labors and wars – a form of universal conscription. Due to manpower shortage, King Rama I ordered all available male Phrai to be registered. The Sak Lek or the consciption tattooing was imposed on the registered Phrai to assign their duties. Boys whose height reached two sok and one khuep were eligible for the Sak Lek. Unregistered men were denied legal existence and would not be protected by any laws. While men were subjected to periodic government services, women were not recruited. There were three types of Phrai;
 Direct royal servants, Phrai luang; Phrai luang were under the services of various functional departments of the royal court. In Ayutthaya, Phrai luang served alternating months, the Khao Duean, for the royal court, six months per year in total, and were allowed freetime to return to their farmlands. In the reign of King Rama I, Phrai luang served alternating two months and became alternating three months in subsequent reigns. Royal services included garrison maintenance and drills, palace and temple constructions, participation in royal ceremonies and warfare.
 Distributed servants, Phrai som; Phrai som were granted by the king to the princes according to the ranks and honors of the princes. The Phrai som served under services of their princes. However, due to the manpower shortage, King Rama I ordered the Phrai som to serve additional one-month per year in direct royal service.
 Taxpayer servants, Phrai suai; Those Phrai who resided in distant regions and whose journey to periodically serve was impractical can pay the tax called Suai instead of physical service. The Suai were usually local commodities and valuables, which the royal court would collect and sell to the foreigners as a source of revenue.
Slaves, That; The That slaves were, by law, considered properties of their masters that can be traded, inherited and given to other people without That consent. In contrast to Phrai who were allowed freetime, That slaves were always in the service of the masters and usually lived in the same quarters. Both men and women can be slaves. The majority of the That rooted in the economic cause. Those commoners who faced financial problems could "sell" themselves to become slaves to earn money. Those who defaulted the debts would become slaves of their lenders. Parents and husbands could also sell their children or wives to become slaves. When a slave managed to repay the debts, the slave would be freed (Thai , to be free). Only two types of slaves that were lifelong and irredeemable. They were That Nai Ruean Bia who were born from slave parents in their services, and That Chaleoi or the war captive slaves. If a slave woman became a wife of the master or his son, she would be freed. If a slave was captured by the enemy troops and managed to break free and return, the slave would be freed.
Outside the social pyramid were the Buddhist monks, who were revered and respected by the Siamese of all classes including the king. The Buddhist monks were exempted from corvée and any forms of taxation as, according to the vinaya, monks could not produce or earn wealth on his own.

Religion 

Maintenance of orthodox Theravadin Sangha monkhood was one of the main policies of Siamese royal court in the early Rattanakosin period. King Rama I ordered the high-ranking monks to convene the Buddhist council to recompile the Tripitaka Pāli canon in 1788, which was regarded as the ninth Buddhist council according to Thai narrative. King Rama I renovated many local existing temples of Bangkok into fine temples. Important monastic temples of Bangkok included Wat Mahathat, Wat Chetuphon, Wat Arun and Wat Rakhang. In the reign of King Rama III, massive number of nearly seventy Buddhist temples were either constructed or renovated in Bangkok, including both royal and demotic temples. In Early Bangkok, there were two Theravadin denominations: the mainstream Siamese Theravada and the Mon tradition. Influx of Mon people from Burma brought, along with them, the Mon Buddhist traditions and Mon monks themselves.

A Siamese man, regardless of social class, was expected to be ordained as a monk at some parts of his life. Usually, a young man at the age of twenty temporarily became a monk as a part of coming-of-age customs. Women could not become monks, though she can shave her hair and wear white robes but would not officially be regarded as a monk. There were two monastic paths: the doctrinal 'city-dwelling' Khamavasi that focused on Theravada philosophy and Pāli learning and the meditational 'forest-dwelling' Aranyavasi that focused on mental exercise and meditation practices. Phra Yanasangvorn Suk was an influential monk in the 1810s who specialized in meditational Vipatsana practices, which was interpreted by some modern scholars as the Tantric Theravada.

Monastic governance was organized into a hierarchical ecclesiastic bureaucracy. Sangharaja or Buddhist hierophant or Supreme Patriarch, appointed by the king, was the head of Siamese monkhood. Sangharaja was treated as a prince with rachasap used on him. Below Sangharaja was the ecclesiastic hierarchy with ranks and positions nominated by the king. The Sangharaja would be entitled Somdet Phra Ariyawongsa Katayan and took official residence at Wat Mahathat. Royal court controlled the Buddhist Sangha to regulate and preserve traditions that were considered orthodox through the Krom Sankhakari or Department of Monastic Affairs that had authorities to investigate Vinaya violations and to defrock monks.

Thammayut 

Upon ordination, the Buddhist monk would take the vow of 227 precepts as the Vinaya or law regulating daily life conducts. Valid ordination required presentation of existing genuine monks to transmit the monkhood onto the new monk. Buddhist monks traced their lineage of ordinations back to Buddha himself. In the early Bangkok period, the Siamese authority faced dilemma in which Buddhist laws declined as the violations of Vinaya were widespread including accumulation of personal wealth and having children. Many attempts by the royal court were made to purify the monkhood and purged any of 'non-conformist' monks.
In 1824, the young Prince Mongkut was ordained as a monk. However, his father King Rama II died fifteen days later and his elder half-brother Prince Chetsadabodin took the throne as King Rama III. Prince Mongkut stayed in monkhood to avoid political intrigues and pursued religious and intellectual life. Prince Mongkut soon found that the mainstream Siamese monkhood was then generally laxed in Vinaya. He then met Phra Sumethmuni a Mon monk in 1830 and discovered that Mon traditions was more strict and closer to the supposed original Buddha's Vinaya and, therefore, the authentic lineage traceable to Buddha. In 1830, Prince Mongkut moved from Wat Mahathat to Wat Samorai and officially began the Thammayut or Dhammayuttika ( 'adhering to the dharma') movement. He studied and followed Mon traditions. Prince Mongkut re-ordained as a monk in Mon tradition at Wat Samorai, where the Thammayut accumulated followers. The mainstream Siamese monks then became known as the Mahanikai. Robes of Thammayut monks were brownish-red in colour and worn over both shoulders in Mon style, while the robe colour of Mahanikai monks was bright-orange. Thammayut forbid the monks to touch money. New Pāli pronunciation and the routine of daily Buddhist chanting were also introduced. Prince Mongkut was appointed as the abbot of Wat Baworn Nivet, which became the headquarter of Thammayut, in 1836.

The royal court had mixed reactions with the Thammayut. King Rama III tolerated Thammayut but commented on the Mon-style robes. Prince Rakronnaret, who oversaw the Krom Sankhakari, was the main opponent of Thammayut. Prince Mongkut acquainted himself with Westerners in Bangkok, including Bishop Pallegoix, and learnt Western sciences and philosophy that would later influence Mongkut's rational rethinking and Buddhist realism in his Thammayut ideals. Thammayut emphasized the importance of Pāli learning as the sole doctrinal source and considered meditations, magical practices and folklore syncretism as mythical. In 1851, Prince Mongkut decided to order Thammayut monks to abandon Mon-style robes due to pressures. Prince Mongkut went to become the king in 1851 and the Mon-style monk robes were reinstated. The leadership of Thammayut passed to Prince Pavares Variyalongkorn.

Hinduism 

Hindu court brahmins continued to play an important role in Siamese royal ceremonies during the Rattanakosin Kingdom into the present. In 1784, King Rama I built a Hindu temple as the home for the Siamese court brahmins, the Devasathan, which still serves as the home of Hinduism in Thailand to the present day. In that same year, the famous Giant Swing was constructed in front of the Devasathan, nearby to Wat Suthat, which was used in the annual Hindu Triyamphway Ceremony, whose function discontinued in 1935 due to safety reasons.

Christianity 

In 1779, King Taksin of Thonburi ordered the expulsion of three French Catholic priests: Olivier-Simon Le Bon the vicar apostolic of Siam, Joseph-Louis Coudé and Arnaud-Antoine Garnault from Siam for their refusals to drink the sacred water to swear fealty to the king. Le Bon retired to Goa where he died in 1780. Coudé left for Kedah and he was appointed the new vicar apostolic of Siam in 1782. Coudé returned to Bangkok in 1783. Coudé was pardoned by King Rama I and was allowed to skip the lustral water drinking ceremony. Coudé took the vicarate seat at Santa Cruz church in Kudi Chin district. However, as French bishops continued to monopolize vicarate position in Siam, Coudé faced oppositions from the Portuguese who formed the majority of Catholics in Bangkok. Coudé left Bangkok for Kedah where he died in 1785 and was succeeded by Garnault in 1787. Vicars apostolic of Siam in the early Bangkok period usually spent most of tenure in Kedah, Penang, and Mergui due to resistance from the Portuguese in Bangkok who always requested for Portuguese bishops from either Goa or Macau. Chantaburi arose as the centre of immigrated Vietnamese Catholics. Kedah, Malacca, Singapore and Tenasserim were added to the territory of apostolic vicarate of Siam in 1840.

Jean-Paul Courvezy, the vicar apostolic of Siam, chose Jean-Baptiste Pallegoix as his coadjutor in 1838. Courvezy moved to stay permanently in Singapore, leaving Pallegoix in Bangkok. In 1841, in accordance with the papal brief Univerci Dominici, the apostolic vicarate of Siam was divided into apostolic vicarates of Eastern Siam, corresponding to Siam proper, and Western Siam corresponding to Malay peninsula. Courvezy remained as the vicar apostolic of Western Siam at Singapore, while Pallegoix was appointed the vicar apostolic of Eastern Siam in Bangkok. Pallegoix was the first vicar apostolic to spend most of his time in Bangkok. In 1841, there were total of 4,300 recorded Catholics in Siam with 1,700 Vietnamese Catholics in St. Francis Xavier Church in Bangkok, 700 Portuguese-Cambodian Catholics in Immaculate Conception Church, 500 Portuguese-Siamese Catholics in the Santa Cruz Church and another 500 at Holy Rosary Calvário Church and 800 Vietnamese Catholics in Chanthaburi. In 1849, during the Cholera epidemic, King Rama III ordered the Christian churches to release domesticated animals and feed them to make merits to appease the diseases according to Buddhist beliefs. Missionaries did not comply and incurred the anger of the king. Pallegoix then decided to release the animals per royal orders. King Rama III was satisfied but ordered the expulsions of eight priests who refused to comply. In 1852, King Mongkut personally wrote to the expelled eight missionaries urging them to return and promising not to impose Buddhist beliefs on missionaries in the future. Pope Pius IX issued thanks to King Mongkut by papal briefs Pergrata Nobis (1852) and Summa quidem (1861).

In 1828 saw the arrival of first two Protestant missionaries in Bangkok: British Jacob Tomlin from London Missionary Society and German Lutheran Karl Gützlaff. Tomlin stayed only for nine months and Gützlaff stayed until 1833. Protestant missions in Siam was then very nascent. American Presbyterian missionaries from ABCFM and Baptist missionaries arrived in this period. American missionaries were called 'physicians' by the Siamese because they usually practiced Western medicine. Though their missionary works were largely unclimactic, they contributed to Thai history by the introduction of Western sciences and technologies. These included Presbyterian Dan Beach Bradley (arrived in 1835), who introduced surgery, printing and vaccination to Siam, Presbyterian Jesse Caswell (arrived in 1839 together with Asa Hemenway), who closely associated with Prince Mongkut, Baptist John Taylor Jones (arrived in 1833) and Baptist J.H. Chandley (arrived in 1843).

Islam 

After the fall of the Ayutthaya Kingdom and failed attempts to reacquire the portage route long by the Chakri rulers, Persian and Muslim influence in Siam declined as Chinese influence within the kingdom grew. Despite this, however, the Muslim community remained a sizable minority in Bangkok, particularly in the first hundred years or so.

After the Fall of Ayutthaya, Shiite Muslims of Persian descent from Ayutthaya settled in the Kudi Chin district. ‘Kudi’ was the Siamese term for Shiite Imambarah, though it could also refer to a mosque. Muslim communities in Siam were led by Phraya Chula Ratchamontri, the position that had been held by a single lineage of Shiite Persian descendant of Sheikh Ahmad since 1656 and until 1939. Phraya Chula Ratchamontri was also the Lord of the Right Pier who headed the Kromma Tha Khwa or the Department of the Right Pier that dealt with trade and affairs with Muslim Indians and Middle Easterners. Shiite Persians were elite Muslims who served as officials in Kromma Tha Khwa. Shiites in Siam were characterized by their ritual of the Mourning of Muharram or Chao Sen ceremony (Imam Hussein was called Chao Sen  in Siamese). King Rama II ordered the Muharram rituals to be performed before him in the royal palace in 1815 and 1816. Kudi Mosques were established and concentrated on the West bank of Chao Phraya River in Thonburi. Important Kudis in Thonburi included Tonson Mosque (Kudi Yai or the Great Kudi, oldest mosque in Bangkok), Kudi Charoenphat (Kudi Lang, the Lower Kudi) and Bangluang Mosque (Kudi Khao or the White Kudi).

The Siamese used the term Khaek for the Islamic peoples in general. In traditional Siam, religion was closely tied with ethnicity. Muslims in Siam included the Sunni Khaek Cham and Khaek Malayu (Malays) and Shiite Khaek Ma-ngon or Khaek Chao Sen, referring to Persians.

Military 

The Burmese Wars and the Fall of Ayutthaya in 1767 prompted the Siamese to adopt new tactics. Less defensive strategies and effective manpower control contributed to Siamese military successes against her traditional enemies. Acquisition of Western flintlock firearms through diplomatic and private purchases was crucial.

In wartime, all court officials and ministers, civilian or military, were expected to lead armies in battle. The bureaucratic apparatus would turn into war command hierarchy with the king as supreme commander and ministers becoming war generals. There was a specific martial law regulating the war conducts. A general defeated by the enemy in battlefield would be, in theory, subjected to death penalty. In the offensives, auspicious date and time were set to begin marching. Brahmanistic ceremony of cutting trees with similar names to the enemy was performed, while the army marched through a gate with Brahmins blessing with sacred water.

Siamese armies in the early Bangkok period consisted mostly of conscripted militias, who might or might not go through military training. There was also professional standing army – the Krom Asa – but its role in warfare was largely diminished in comparison to the Ayutthaya period due to the manpower shortage. The Phrai militia infantry, who were armed with melee weapons such as swords, spears or javelin or matchlock firearms formed the backbone of Siamese armies. Regiments also indicated social hierarchy, with nobility on horseback and the king on an elephant, while commoners were on foot. Krom Phra Asawarat was responsible for horse-keeping for royal elite troops, while Krom Khotchaban was responsible for taking care of royal elephants.

There were ethnic regiments that were assigned with special tasks. For example, the Krom Asa Cham, the Muslim Cham-Malay regiment that took responsibilities in naval warfare and the Mon regiment that served as Burmese-Siamese border patrol. The Mon regiment played crucial role in surveillance of the borders with Burma due to their familiarity with the area and would provide timely alerts of imminent Burmese incursion to the Bangkok court. The members of the Mon regiment were usually Mon immigrants who had been escaping the Burmese rule into Siam since the Thonburi period.

Weapons and artillery 

The Portuguese introduced matchlock arquebus to Siam in the sixteenth century. The Portuguese and other Europeans filled in positions in the arquebusier regiment known as Krom Farang Maen Peun. Though the Siamese were unable to produce firearms, European traders provided unrelenting sources of firearms. Captured enemy ammunition was another source of supply. Firearms usage later spread to native Siamese soldiers who received training from European arquebusiers.

The Siamese were exposed to flintlock muskets from French soldiers visiting Siam in the seventeenth century during the reign of King Narai. Flintlock muskets produced twice firing frequency in comparison to matchlock arquebus. However, like other kingdoms in the Far East, flintlock firearms remained rare commodity and were acquired through purchases from Westerners. Francis Light the British merchant, who had been residing in Thalang or Phuket Island from 1765 to 1786 when he moved to Penang, had been a major supplier of firearms to the Siamese court. During the Nine Armies' War in 1785, Light provided the defenders of Thalang with muskets. Light also gave 1,400 muskets to the Siamese court, earning him the title Phraya Ratcha Kapitan. In 1792, the Samuha Kalahom asked to buy muskets and gunpowder from Francis Light. Flintlock muskets were usually reserved for the elite troops and those who could afford. Krom Phra Saengpuen, was responsible for the keeping and training of firearms. Royal court strictly controlled the firearm trade in Siam. Firearms could only be purchased by the royal court and unpurchased firearms should be taken back.

The Siamese had been able to cast their own cannons since the Ayutthaya period. Native Siamese large muzzleloader cannons were called Charong, which were made of bronze and usually 4-5 inches in calibre. Charong cannons were put on city walls or on warships. Bariam cannons ( from Malay meriam) were European-produced cast-iron cannons with relatively larger calibre and shorter barrel. Barium cannons inflicted high damages on the battlefields and were sought after to purchase from Westerners by the court. Small breechloader cannons were also used. In the reign of King Rama III, the Siamese learned to produce small cast-iron cannons from the Chinese. In 1834, Christian Vietnamese from Cochinchina immigrated to settle in Bangkok and formed the Vietnamese firearm regiment that specialized in cannons and muskets.

In the early Rattanakosin period, Siam accumulated cannons and firearms. In 1807, there were total 2,500 functioning cannons in Siam, with 1,200 of them stationed in Bangkok, 1,100 distributed to provinces and the last 200 installed on 16 royal warships. The total number of firearms in Siam in 1827 were over 57,000.

Navy 

Before 1852, Siam did not have a standing navy. Most of the Continental Southeast Asian warfare was land-based or riverine. When a naval warfare was initiated, the authority would gather native Siamese riverine barges and, if possible, Western galleons or Chinese junks. The Siamese relied on either Chinese or Malay junks for seafaring activities. Commercial and war vessels were used interchangeably. The navy was manned by the Krom Asa Cham or the Cham-Malay regiment who possessed naval knowledge. The naval commander would be either Phraya Ratchawangsan, the leader of Krom Asa Cham, or Phrakhlang, the Minister of Trade.

Growing powers of the British and the Vietnamese in the 1820s urged Siam to engage in naval preparations against possible incursions from sea. Siamese temporary fleets composed of sampans, which were for riverine and coastal campaigns and either constructed or levied. Siamese warships were essentially Chinese junks armed with Charong cannons. In the 1820s, Chao Phraya Nakhon Noi maintained his dock at Trang and became an important Siamese shipbuilder. In 1828, Nakhon Noi constructed augmented Chinese junks rigged with Western masts. These Chinese-Western fusion war junks were used during the Battle of Vàm Nao in 1833 where they faced large Vietnamese 'mobile fort' Định Quốc war junks armed with heavy cannons. King Rama III then ordered the construction of Vietnamese-style mobile-fort junks in 1834. Prince Isaret (later known as Pinklao) and Chuang Bunnag pioneered the construction of western-style seafaring ships. In 1835, Chuang Bunnag successfully constructed Ariel (Thai name Klaew Klang Samutr) as the first native brig, while Prince Isaret constructed Fairy (Thai name Phuttha Amnat) as a barque in 1836. However, the barques and brigantines were already outdated by the mid-nineteenth century in favor of steamships. Robert Hunter, a British merchant in Bangkok, brought a steamboat to Bangkok for the royal court to see in 1844 but King Rama III refused to buy the ship due to overpricing.

Culture

Art and Architecture

Continuation from Ayutthaya 

As early Chakri kings sought to emulate old Ayutthaya, art tradition of Early Rattanakosin Period followed the style of Late Ayutthaya. Siamese arts and architecture reached new peak in Early Bangkok in early nineteenth century. Prevailing mood was that of reconstruction with little explicit innovations. Like in Ayutthaya, the Bangkok court hosted Chang Sip Mu or Ten Guilds of Royal Craftsmen to produce arts, crafts and architecture. Traditional Siamese arts mainly served royal palaces and temples. King Rama I the founder of Rattanakosin kingdom began construction of the Grand Palace including Wat Phra Kaew, which was the 'royal chapel' used by the king for ceremonies without any monks residing, in 1783. Royal palace pavilions took inspiration from Ayutthayan palace buildings. When finished, Wat Phra Kaew housed the Emerald Buddha, moved from Wat Arun in 1784. Ubosoth or main ordination hall of Wat Phra Kaew is the best-preserved structure that can be an example of how Ayutthayan style was implemented in Early Bangkok Period. Three-tiered roof, decorated gable motifs with curved base and inlaid mother-of-pearl doors of the Ubosoth were characteristic of Ayutthayan architecture.

In Early Bangkok Period, local existing temples in Bangkok were renovated into fine temples. Central structures of Thai temples included ordination hall Ubosoth, which was wide rectangular in shape, for monks to chant and perform ceremonies and Wiharn, which was for general public religious services. Bas reliefs of gable pediments represented Hindu figures and patterns made from gilded carved wood or glass mosaics. Innovation was that temple buildings in Bangkok Period were enclosed by cloister galleries called Rabiang Khot, which was not present in Ayutthaya. Sacred ceremonial grounds for monks were marked by Bai Sema stones. Prasat was new structure of Early Bangkok characterized by cruciform plan with Angkorian-style Prang towering in the center. While temples were built with sturdy bricks, vernacular and lay residential structures were wooden and did not endure for long period of time.

Redented-corner and Neo-Angkorian Prang were the most popular styles of Chedis or pagodas in Early Bangkok Period. The grand Prang pagoda of Wat Arun was constructed in 1842 and finished in 1851. It remained the tallest structure in Siam for a significant period of time. When King Mongkut, who was then a Buddhist monk, made pilgrimages to Northern Siam he took inspiration from Sukhothai-Singhalese rounded pagoda style, culminating in construction of round-shaped Wat Phra Pathomchedi pagoda in 1853.

Traditional Thai painting was dedicated to Buddhist mural arts of temples depicting Buddhist themes including the life of Buddha, Jataka tales and cosmology. Colors were restricted mostly to earth-tones.

Buddha images were not as extensively cast as they used to be in Ayutthaya Period. Numerous Buddha images from ruinous cities of Ayutthaya, Sukhothai and Phitsanulok were moved to be placed in various temples in Bangkok during Early Bangkok Period.

Chinese influences 

King Rama III, known before ascension as Prince Chetsadabodin, had overseen Kromma Tha or Ministry of Trade and had acquainted with Chinese traders in Bangkok. In 1820, Prince Chetsadabodin led army to the west to fight the Burmese. He rested his troops at Chom Thong where he renovated the existing Chom Thong Temple in Chinese style using stucco decorated with Chinese motifs rather than traditional Siamese decorations. The renovation completed in 1831 and the temple became known as Wat Ratcha-orot Temple, which was the prototype of Sino-Siamese fusion architecture – called Phra Ratchaniyom "Royal Preference" style. Sinicization was strong during the reign of King Rama III (r. 1824–1851), during which up to seventy Theravadin temples were either constructed or renovated and one quarter of those temples involved were in Chinese style. Chinese elements introduced were blue-and-white inlaid with stucco, ornate ceramic mosaic, ceramic roofs and ridged tiles. Pediments were plastered and decorated with Chinese floral motifs in ceramic mosaics rather than traditional wooden gilded Hindu-deities decorations. Chinese decorative objects including Chinese pagodas, door guardian statues, door frames and glass paintings were imported from China to be installed in chinoiserie temples. Well-known Chinese-style temples included Wat Ratcha-orot, Wat Thepthidaram and Wat Phichaiyat. Neo-Angkorian Prang of Wat Arun, constructed during the reign of Rama III, was adorned with Chinese stucco motifs, representing fusion of array of styles. Chinese style persisted into the reign of King Mongkut in the 1860s.

Western influences 

Siam opened the kingdom as the result of the Bowring Treaty of 1855, leading to influx of Western influences onto Siamese art. Khrua In Khong, a native Siamese monk-painter, was known for his earliest adoption of Western realism and for his impressionist works. Previously, traditional Siamese painting was limited to two-dimensional presentation. Khrua In Khong, active in the 1850s, introduced Western-influenced three-dimensional style to depict Buddhist scenes and Dharma riddles. In his temple-mural paintings, Khrua In Khong depicted Western townscapes, applying laws of perspective and using color and light-and-shade techniques.

French bishop Pallegoix introduced daguerreotypes to Siam in 1845. Pallegoix had another French priest Louis Larnaudie bring camera apparatus from Paris to Bangkok. However, Siamese superstitious belief was against photography in aspect that photos would entrap person's soul. Later King Mongkut embraced photography. Larnaudie taught wet-plate photography to a Siamese nobleman Mot Amatyakul, who was the first native Siamese photographer, and a Siamese Catholic Francis Chit. Francis Chit opened his own studio in Kudi Chin in 1863, producing photos of temples, palaces, dignitaries, landscapes and cityscapes. Chit was appointed as official royal photographer in 1866 with title Khun Sunthornsathisalak and was later promoted in 1880 to Luang Akkhani Naruemit. Francis Chit accompanied King Chulalongkorn as royal photographer on royal trips abroad. Chit sent his son to learn photography at Germany and after his death in 1891 his studio Francis Chit & Sons continued to operate.

Language and Literature

Linguistic changes 

Siamese (now known as Thai) was the language of Rattanakosin government. The royal court maintained a specialized register called Rachasap to be used onto royalty characterized by Khmer lexicon usage. Another set of special vocabulary was used onto the monks. Thai script was used to write worldly matters including historical chronicles, government decrees and personal poems, while a variant of Khmer script called Khom Thai script was used to write Buddhist Pāli texts including the Tripitaka. Native Siamese people spoke Siamese language. Other languages were spoken by ethnic immigrants or people of tributary states including Northern Thai language of Lanna, Lao language of Laos and Khorat Plateau, Malay language of southern sultanates and other minority languages. Languages of Chinese immigrants were Teochew and Hokkien. Ethnic immigration also affected Siamese language. Plethora of Southern Min Chinese lexicon entered Thai language. Chinese loanwords prompted invention of two new tone markers; Mai-Tri and Mai-Chattawa that were used exclusively for Chinese words to transmit Chinese tones. Mai-Tri and Mai-Chattawa first appeared around mid-to-late eighteenth century.

During religious reforms in mid-nineteenth century, King Mongkut discouraged the use of Khom Thai script in religious works for reason that its exclusivity gave wrong impression that Khmer script was holy and magical, ordering the monks to switch to Thai script in recording Buddhist canon. Mongkut also invented Roman-inspired 'Ariyaka script'  to promote printing of Tripitaka instead of traditionally inscribing on palm leaves but it did not come into popular use and eventually fell out of usage. Only in 1893 that first whole set of the Pāli canon in Thai script was printed.

Traditional Literature 
Siamese royal court of Early Bangkok Period sought to restore royal epics and plays lost during the wars. Kings Rama I and Rama II themselves wrote and recomposed royal plays including Ramakien (adapted from Indian epic Ramayana) and Inao (Thai version of Javanese Panji tales). Kings' own works were called Phra Ratchaniphon ( "Royal writing"). Refined royal theater plays, known as Lakhon Nai ( "Inner plays"), was reserved only for royal court and was performed by all-female actors that were part of royal regalia, in contrast to vernacular, boisterous Lakhon Nok ( "Outer plays") that entertained commoner folk and performed by all-male troupes. Krom Alak or Department of Royal Scribes formed circles of illustrious court poets and scholars under royal supervision. Traditional Siamese non-fiction genre includes Buddhist and historical themes. Chaophraya Phrakhlang Hon was known for his translation of Chinese Romance of Three Kingdoms and Burmese Razadarit Ayedawbon into prose works Samkok and Rachathirat, respectively. Despite foreign origins of these works, they were appropriated into Thai literature repertoire to be distinctively Thai and incorporated many local Siamese legends. Prince Poramanuchit, who was the Sangharaja hierophant from 1851 to 1853, produced vast array of educational literature including a new version of Thai Vessantara Jātaka, Samutthakhot Khamchan that narrated moral lessons, Krishna teaches his Sister that narrated morals for women and Lilit Taleng Phai (1832) that described Burmese-Siamese Wars of King Naresuan. Traditional Thai literature were produced in first three reigns more than any other periods.King Rama II (r. 1809–1824) was a great patron of Siamese poetry and his reign was considered to be "Golden Age of Thai literature". His court hosted a large number of authors and it was said that any nobles who could compose fine literary works would gain royal favor. King Rama II the 'poet king' was known to personally wrote many works and even composed a new version of Sang Thong, a folktale. The king was an accomplished musician, playing and composing for the fiddle and introducing new instrumental techniques. He was also a sculptor and is said to have sculpted the face of the Niramitr Buddha in Wat Arun. Among royal poets was the most prominent one – Sunthorn Phu (1786–1855), who enjoyed royal favor as one of the most accomplished court poets. Sunthorn Phu's fortunes took a downturn, however, in 1824 when the new king Rama III, whom Sunthorn Phu had previously offended, ascended the throne. Phu ended up leaving royal court to become a wanderer and drunkard. It was during his unfortunate times of life that Sunthorn Phu produced his most famous works. His most important masterpiece was Phra Aphai Mani – a poetic work with more than 30,000 lines telling stories of a rogue womanizer prince who left his kingdom to pursue gallant adventures in the seas. Sunthorn Phu produced many Nirats, poems describing journeys and longing for home and loved ones, including Nirat Mueang Klaeng (journey to Klaeng, his father's hometown, 1806-07), Nirat Phra Bat (journey to Phra Phutthabat, 1807), Nirat Phukhaothong (journey to Ayutthaya, 1828), Nirat Suphan (journey to Suphanburi, 1831), Nirat Phra Pathom (journey to Phra Pathomchedi, 1842) and Nirat Mueang Phet (journey to Phetchaburi). Sunthorn Phu's greatness was his literary range, his brilliant creativity and naturalism not restricted to refined formalities. Phu's genuine language, sincerity and realism made his works appealing to the public mass.

Education 

There was no official institutions for education such as universities in pre-modern Siam. Siamese traditional education was closely tied to the Buddhist religion. Boys went to temples or became novice monks to learn Thai and Pāli languages from monks, who offered tutorships for free as a part of religious works. Princes and young nobles received tuition from high-ranking monks in fine temples. Girls were not expected to be literate and were usually taught domestic arts such as culinary and embroidery. However, education for women was not restricted and upper-class women had more opportunities for literacy. There were some prominent female authors in the early Rattanakosin period. Craftsmanships and artisanships were taught internally in the same family or community.

The only higher education available in pre-modern Siam was the Buddhist Pāli doctrinal learning – the Pariyattham. Monks took exams to be qualified to rise up in the ecclesiastic bureaucracy. There were three levels of Pariyattham exams inherited from Ayutthaya with each level called Parian. In the 1810s, the three Parian levels were re-organized into nine Parian levels. Pariyattham exams were organized by the royal court, who encouraged Pāli learning in order to uphold Buddhism, and were usually held in the Emerald Buddha temple. Examinations involved translation and oral recitation of Pāli doctrines in front of examiner monks. Pariyattham exam was the vehicle both for intellectual pursuits and for advancement in monastic hierarchy for a monk.

King Rama III ordered traditional Thai religious and secular arts, including Buddhist doctrines, traditional medicine, literature and geopolitics to be inscribed on stone steles at Wat Pho from 1831 to 1841. The Epigraphic Archives of Wat Pho was recognized by UNESCO as a Memory of the World and were examples of materials with closer resemblance to modern education. The Epigraphical Archives of Wat Pho (external link)

Educational reform
Rama VI was the first king of Siam to set up a model of the constitution at Dusit Palace. He wanted first to see how things could be managed under this Western system. He saw advantages in the system, and thought that Siam could move slowly towards it, but could not be adopted right away as the majority of the Siamese people did not have enough education to understand such a change just yet. In 1916 higher education came to Siam. Rama VI set up Vajiravudh College, modeled after the British Eton College, as well as the first Thai university, Chulalongkorn University, modeled after Oxbridge.

Clothing 

As same as Ayutthaya period, both Thai males and females dressed themselves with a loincloth wrap called chong kraben. Men wore their chong kraben to cover the waist to halfway down the thigh, while women covered the waist to well below the knee. Bare chests and bare feet were accepted as part of the Thai formal dress code, and is observed in murals, illustrated manuscripts, and early photographs up to the middle of the 1800s. However, after the Second Fall of Ayutthaya, central Thai women began cutting their hair in a crew-cut short style, which remained the national hairstyle until the 1900s. Prior to the 20th century, the primary markers that distinguished class in Thai clothing were the use of cotton and silk cloths with printed or woven motifs, but both commoners and royals alike wore wrapped, not stitched clothing.

From the 1860s onward, Thai royals "selectively adopted Victorian corporeal and sartorial etiquette to fashion modern personas that were publicized domestically and internationally by means of mechanically reproduced images." Stitched clothing, including court attire and ceremonial uniforms, were invented during the reign of King Chulalongkorn. Western forms of dress became popular among urbanites in Bangkok during this time period. 

See also
 Coronation of the Thai monarch
 List of Chakri kings
 Chakri kings' family tree
 History of Bangkok

Notes

References

Bibliography
 Greene, Stephen Lyon Wakeman. Absolute Dreams. Thai Government Under Rama VI, 1910–1925. Bangkok: White Lotus, 1999

 
18th century in Siam
.
.
18th century in Cambodia
19th century in Cambodia
History of Laos
History of Malaysia
States and territories established in 1782
States and territories disestablished in 1932
.
Former countries of the interwar period
2nd millennium in Thailand
1782 establishments

18th-century establishments in Siam
Former kingdoms